

587001–587100 

|-bgcolor=#d6d6d6
| 587001 ||  || — || August 27, 2005 || Kitt Peak || Spacewatch ||  || align=right | 2.1 km || 
|-id=002 bgcolor=#fefefe
| 587002 ||  || — || August 28, 2005 || Kitt Peak || Spacewatch ||  || align=right data-sort-value="0.55" | 550 m || 
|-id=003 bgcolor=#d6d6d6
| 587003 ||  || — || August 30, 2005 || Vicques || M. Ory ||  || align=right | 2.6 km || 
|-id=004 bgcolor=#fefefe
| 587004 ||  || — || August 6, 2005 || Palomar || NEAT ||  || align=right data-sort-value="0.76" | 760 m || 
|-id=005 bgcolor=#d6d6d6
| 587005 ||  || — || August 29, 2005 || Kitt Peak || Spacewatch ||  || align=right | 2.2 km || 
|-id=006 bgcolor=#d6d6d6
| 587006 ||  || — || August 28, 2005 || Kitt Peak || Spacewatch ||  || align=right | 2.3 km || 
|-id=007 bgcolor=#d6d6d6
| 587007 ||  || — || August 28, 2005 || Kitt Peak || Spacewatch ||  || align=right | 2.0 km || 
|-id=008 bgcolor=#d6d6d6
| 587008 ||  || — || August 28, 2005 || Kitt Peak || Spacewatch ||  || align=right | 2.6 km || 
|-id=009 bgcolor=#d6d6d6
| 587009 ||  || — || August 26, 2005 || Palomar || NEAT ||  || align=right | 3.5 km || 
|-id=010 bgcolor=#d6d6d6
| 587010 ||  || — || August 30, 2005 || Kitt Peak || Spacewatch ||  || align=right | 2.3 km || 
|-id=011 bgcolor=#d6d6d6
| 587011 ||  || — || July 29, 2005 || Palomar || NEAT ||  || align=right | 2.9 km || 
|-id=012 bgcolor=#E9E9E9
| 587012 ||  || — || August 30, 2005 || Palomar || NEAT ||  || align=right | 2.0 km || 
|-id=013 bgcolor=#d6d6d6
| 587013 ||  || — || August 31, 2005 || Palomar || NEAT || Tj (2.94) || align=right | 5.7 km || 
|-id=014 bgcolor=#E9E9E9
| 587014 ||  || — || April 28, 2012 || Mount Lemmon || Mount Lemmon Survey ||  || align=right data-sort-value="0.82" | 820 m || 
|-id=015 bgcolor=#d6d6d6
| 587015 ||  || — || August 30, 2005 || Kitt Peak || Spacewatch ||  || align=right | 2.5 km || 
|-id=016 bgcolor=#d6d6d6
| 587016 ||  || — || February 9, 2013 || Haleakala || Pan-STARRS ||  || align=right | 2.6 km || 
|-id=017 bgcolor=#d6d6d6
| 587017 ||  || — || August 29, 2005 || Palomar || NEAT ||  || align=right | 2.4 km || 
|-id=018 bgcolor=#d6d6d6
| 587018 ||  || — || October 26, 2011 || Haleakala || Pan-STARRS ||  || align=right | 2.6 km || 
|-id=019 bgcolor=#E9E9E9
| 587019 ||  || — || August 30, 2005 || Kitt Peak || Spacewatch ||  || align=right data-sort-value="0.73" | 730 m || 
|-id=020 bgcolor=#d6d6d6
| 587020 ||  || — || January 17, 2013 || Kitt Peak || Spacewatch ||  || align=right | 2.3 km || 
|-id=021 bgcolor=#fefefe
| 587021 ||  || — || August 30, 2005 || Kitt Peak || Spacewatch ||  || align=right data-sort-value="0.58" | 580 m || 
|-id=022 bgcolor=#d6d6d6
| 587022 ||  || — || October 8, 2016 || Haleakala || Pan-STARRS ||  || align=right | 2.4 km || 
|-id=023 bgcolor=#fefefe
| 587023 ||  || — || September 21, 2017 || Haleakala || Pan-STARRS ||  || align=right data-sort-value="0.78" | 780 m || 
|-id=024 bgcolor=#d6d6d6
| 587024 ||  || — || August 29, 2005 || Kitt Peak || Spacewatch || 3:2 || align=right | 3.4 km || 
|-id=025 bgcolor=#FA8072
| 587025 ||  || — || December 15, 2011 || Haleakala || Pan-STARRS || H || align=right data-sort-value="0.62" | 620 m || 
|-id=026 bgcolor=#d6d6d6
| 587026 ||  || — || August 30, 2005 || Kitt Peak || Spacewatch ||  || align=right | 2.0 km || 
|-id=027 bgcolor=#fefefe
| 587027 ||  || — || August 28, 2005 || Kitt Peak || Spacewatch ||  || align=right data-sort-value="0.65" | 650 m || 
|-id=028 bgcolor=#d6d6d6
| 587028 ||  || — || August 30, 2005 || Kitt Peak || Spacewatch || 3:2 || align=right | 3.8 km || 
|-id=029 bgcolor=#d6d6d6
| 587029 ||  || — || August 29, 2005 || Kitt Peak || Spacewatch ||  || align=right | 2.2 km || 
|-id=030 bgcolor=#d6d6d6
| 587030 ||  || — || August 28, 2005 || Kitt Peak || Spacewatch ||  || align=right | 2.0 km || 
|-id=031 bgcolor=#fefefe
| 587031 ||  || — || September 1, 2005 || Palomar || NEAT ||  || align=right data-sort-value="0.74" | 740 m || 
|-id=032 bgcolor=#d6d6d6
| 587032 ||  || — || September 12, 2005 || Kitt Peak || Spacewatch ||  || align=right | 3.3 km || 
|-id=033 bgcolor=#d6d6d6
| 587033 ||  || — || September 13, 2005 || Vallemare Borbona || V. S. Casulli ||  || align=right | 2.1 km || 
|-id=034 bgcolor=#d6d6d6
| 587034 ||  || — || September 3, 2005 || Mauna Kea || Mauna Kea Obs. ||  || align=right | 2.1 km || 
|-id=035 bgcolor=#d6d6d6
| 587035 ||  || — || September 3, 2005 || Mauna Kea || Mauna Kea Obs. ||  || align=right | 2.1 km || 
|-id=036 bgcolor=#d6d6d6
| 587036 ||  || — || August 30, 2005 || Kitt Peak || Spacewatch ||  || align=right | 2.2 km || 
|-id=037 bgcolor=#d6d6d6
| 587037 ||  || — || January 28, 2007 || Kitt Peak || Spacewatch ||  || align=right | 2.2 km || 
|-id=038 bgcolor=#d6d6d6
| 587038 ||  || — || October 27, 2005 || Catalina || CSS ||  || align=right | 3.4 km || 
|-id=039 bgcolor=#d6d6d6
| 587039 ||  || — || September 3, 2005 || Palomar || NEAT ||  || align=right | 3.4 km || 
|-id=040 bgcolor=#d6d6d6
| 587040 ||  || — || September 13, 2005 || Kitt Peak || Spacewatch ||  || align=right | 2.1 km || 
|-id=041 bgcolor=#d6d6d6
| 587041 ||  || — || March 6, 2013 || Haleakala || Pan-STARRS ||  || align=right | 2.4 km || 
|-id=042 bgcolor=#d6d6d6
| 587042 ||  || — || March 28, 2011 || Kitt Peak || Spacewatch || 3:2 || align=right | 3.5 km || 
|-id=043 bgcolor=#d6d6d6
| 587043 ||  || — || September 1, 2005 || Kitt Peak || Spacewatch ||  || align=right | 2.2 km || 
|-id=044 bgcolor=#d6d6d6
| 587044 ||  || — || September 1, 2005 || Kitt Peak || Spacewatch ||  || align=right | 2.0 km || 
|-id=045 bgcolor=#d6d6d6
| 587045 ||  || — || September 24, 2005 || Kitt Peak || Spacewatch ||  || align=right | 1.8 km || 
|-id=046 bgcolor=#d6d6d6
| 587046 ||  || — || September 27, 2005 || Kitt Peak || Spacewatch || 3:2 || align=right | 3.3 km || 
|-id=047 bgcolor=#d6d6d6
| 587047 ||  || — || September 24, 2005 || Kitt Peak || Spacewatch ||  || align=right | 2.4 km || 
|-id=048 bgcolor=#d6d6d6
| 587048 ||  || — || September 25, 2005 || Kitt Peak || Spacewatch ||  || align=right | 1.8 km || 
|-id=049 bgcolor=#E9E9E9
| 587049 ||  || — || September 25, 2005 || Kitt Peak || Spacewatch ||  || align=right data-sort-value="0.71" | 710 m || 
|-id=050 bgcolor=#d6d6d6
| 587050 ||  || — || August 31, 2005 || Palomar || NEAT ||  || align=right | 2.5 km || 
|-id=051 bgcolor=#d6d6d6
| 587051 ||  || — || September 26, 2005 || Kitt Peak || Spacewatch ||  || align=right | 1.8 km || 
|-id=052 bgcolor=#fefefe
| 587052 ||  || — || September 29, 2005 || Kitt Peak || Spacewatch ||  || align=right data-sort-value="0.59" | 590 m || 
|-id=053 bgcolor=#d6d6d6
| 587053 ||  || — || September 29, 2005 || Kitt Peak || Spacewatch ||  || align=right | 3.0 km || 
|-id=054 bgcolor=#d6d6d6
| 587054 ||  || — || September 30, 2005 || Kitt Peak || Spacewatch ||  || align=right | 2.3 km || 
|-id=055 bgcolor=#fefefe
| 587055 ||  || — || September 30, 2005 || Kitt Peak || Spacewatch ||  || align=right data-sort-value="0.93" | 930 m || 
|-id=056 bgcolor=#d6d6d6
| 587056 ||  || — || September 30, 2005 || Mount Lemmon || Mount Lemmon Survey ||  || align=right | 2.0 km || 
|-id=057 bgcolor=#d6d6d6
| 587057 ||  || — || September 30, 2005 || Mount Lemmon || Mount Lemmon Survey ||  || align=right | 2.0 km || 
|-id=058 bgcolor=#d6d6d6
| 587058 ||  || — || September 13, 2005 || Kitt Peak || Spacewatch ||  || align=right | 2.4 km || 
|-id=059 bgcolor=#d6d6d6
| 587059 ||  || — || April 4, 2002 || Palomar || NEAT || LIX || align=right | 3.5 km || 
|-id=060 bgcolor=#fefefe
| 587060 ||  || — || September 25, 2005 || Kitt Peak || Spacewatch || MAS || align=right data-sort-value="0.63" | 630 m || 
|-id=061 bgcolor=#d6d6d6
| 587061 ||  || — || September 26, 2005 || Kitt Peak || Spacewatch ||  || align=right | 2.2 km || 
|-id=062 bgcolor=#d6d6d6
| 587062 ||  || — || September 29, 2005 || Kitt Peak || Spacewatch ||  || align=right | 2.5 km || 
|-id=063 bgcolor=#fefefe
| 587063 ||  || — || September 30, 2005 || Mauna Kea || Mauna Kea Obs. ||  || align=right data-sort-value="0.78" | 780 m || 
|-id=064 bgcolor=#fefefe
| 587064 ||  || — || September 30, 2005 || Mauna Kea || Mauna Kea Obs. || V || align=right data-sort-value="0.63" | 630 m || 
|-id=065 bgcolor=#d6d6d6
| 587065 ||  || — || October 1, 2005 || Apache Point || SDSS Collaboration ||  || align=right | 2.6 km || 
|-id=066 bgcolor=#d6d6d6
| 587066 ||  || — || September 23, 2005 || Kitt Peak || Spacewatch || 3:2 || align=right | 4.1 km || 
|-id=067 bgcolor=#d6d6d6
| 587067 ||  || — || September 29, 2005 || Mount Lemmon || Mount Lemmon Survey ||  || align=right | 2.1 km || 
|-id=068 bgcolor=#d6d6d6
| 587068 ||  || — || October 1, 2005 || Apache Point || SDSS Collaboration ||  || align=right | 2.6 km || 
|-id=069 bgcolor=#d6d6d6
| 587069 ||  || — || October 11, 2005 || Apache Point || SDSS Collaboration ||  || align=right | 2.0 km || 
|-id=070 bgcolor=#E9E9E9
| 587070 ||  || — || November 12, 2005 || Kitt Peak || Spacewatch ||  || align=right | 2.1 km || 
|-id=071 bgcolor=#fefefe
| 587071 ||  || — || September 30, 2005 || Mount Lemmon || Mount Lemmon Survey ||  || align=right data-sort-value="0.65" | 650 m || 
|-id=072 bgcolor=#d6d6d6
| 587072 ||  || — || September 29, 2005 || Kitt Peak || Spacewatch ||  || align=right | 2.9 km || 
|-id=073 bgcolor=#d6d6d6
| 587073 ||  || — || September 29, 2005 || Kitt Peak || Spacewatch ||  || align=right | 3.2 km || 
|-id=074 bgcolor=#d6d6d6
| 587074 ||  || — || September 29, 2005 || Kitt Peak || Spacewatch ||  || align=right | 2.7 km || 
|-id=075 bgcolor=#fefefe
| 587075 ||  || — || September 26, 2005 || Kitt Peak || Spacewatch ||  || align=right data-sort-value="0.56" | 560 m || 
|-id=076 bgcolor=#d6d6d6
| 587076 ||  || — || February 13, 2013 || Haleakala || Pan-STARRS ||  || align=right | 2.2 km || 
|-id=077 bgcolor=#d6d6d6
| 587077 ||  || — || February 28, 2008 || Mount Lemmon || Mount Lemmon Survey ||  || align=right | 2.2 km || 
|-id=078 bgcolor=#E9E9E9
| 587078 ||  || — || September 1, 2013 || Haleakala || Pan-STARRS ||  || align=right data-sort-value="0.57" | 570 m || 
|-id=079 bgcolor=#E9E9E9
| 587079 ||  || — || September 30, 2005 || Mauna Kea || Mauna Kea Obs. ||  || align=right data-sort-value="0.99" | 990 m || 
|-id=080 bgcolor=#d6d6d6
| 587080 ||  || — || September 30, 2005 || Mount Lemmon || Mount Lemmon Survey ||  || align=right | 2.4 km || 
|-id=081 bgcolor=#d6d6d6
| 587081 ||  || — || September 29, 2005 || Mount Lemmon || Mount Lemmon Survey ||  || align=right | 1.5 km || 
|-id=082 bgcolor=#d6d6d6
| 587082 ||  || — || September 29, 2005 || Mount Lemmon || Mount Lemmon Survey ||  || align=right | 1.9 km || 
|-id=083 bgcolor=#d6d6d6
| 587083 ||  || — || October 1, 2005 || Kitt Peak || Spacewatch ||  || align=right | 1.9 km || 
|-id=084 bgcolor=#fefefe
| 587084 ||  || — || March 14, 2004 || Kitt Peak || Spacewatch || H || align=right data-sort-value="0.54" | 540 m || 
|-id=085 bgcolor=#d6d6d6
| 587085 ||  || — || October 1, 2005 || Mount Lemmon || Mount Lemmon Survey ||  || align=right | 2.3 km || 
|-id=086 bgcolor=#d6d6d6
| 587086 ||  || — || September 26, 2005 || Socorro || LINEAR ||  || align=right | 2.7 km || 
|-id=087 bgcolor=#d6d6d6
| 587087 ||  || — || October 1, 2005 || Kitt Peak || Spacewatch || EOS || align=right | 1.8 km || 
|-id=088 bgcolor=#E9E9E9
| 587088 ||  || — || October 1, 2005 || Mount Lemmon || Mount Lemmon Survey ||  || align=right data-sort-value="0.57" | 570 m || 
|-id=089 bgcolor=#d6d6d6
| 587089 ||  || — || September 25, 2005 || Kitt Peak || Spacewatch ||  || align=right | 1.9 km || 
|-id=090 bgcolor=#d6d6d6
| 587090 ||  || — || September 25, 2005 || Kitt Peak || Spacewatch ||  || align=right | 1.7 km || 
|-id=091 bgcolor=#fefefe
| 587091 ||  || — || October 5, 2005 || Mount Lemmon || Mount Lemmon Survey ||  || align=right data-sort-value="0.50" | 500 m || 
|-id=092 bgcolor=#d6d6d6
| 587092 ||  || — || October 6, 2005 || Mount Lemmon || Mount Lemmon Survey ||  || align=right | 1.8 km || 
|-id=093 bgcolor=#fefefe
| 587093 ||  || — || October 3, 2005 || Kitt Peak || Spacewatch ||  || align=right data-sort-value="0.43" | 430 m || 
|-id=094 bgcolor=#d6d6d6
| 587094 ||  || — || October 3, 2005 || Kitt Peak || Spacewatch || SHU3:2 || align=right | 5.4 km || 
|-id=095 bgcolor=#fefefe
| 587095 ||  || — || October 7, 2005 || Kitt Peak || Spacewatch ||  || align=right data-sort-value="0.56" | 560 m || 
|-id=096 bgcolor=#d6d6d6
| 587096 ||  || — || September 29, 2005 || Kitt Peak || Spacewatch || 3:2 || align=right | 3.2 km || 
|-id=097 bgcolor=#d6d6d6
| 587097 ||  || — || March 5, 2002 || Apache Point || SDSS Collaboration ||  || align=right | 2.8 km || 
|-id=098 bgcolor=#fefefe
| 587098 ||  || — || September 29, 2005 || Kitt Peak || Spacewatch || H || align=right data-sort-value="0.53" | 530 m || 
|-id=099 bgcolor=#d6d6d6
| 587099 ||  || — || October 8, 2005 || Kitt Peak || Spacewatch ||  || align=right | 2.0 km || 
|-id=100 bgcolor=#E9E9E9
| 587100 ||  || — || October 8, 2005 || Kitt Peak || Spacewatch ||  || align=right data-sort-value="0.68" | 680 m || 
|}

587101–587200 

|-bgcolor=#d6d6d6
| 587101 ||  || — || October 8, 2005 || Kitt Peak || Spacewatch ||  || align=right | 2.3 km || 
|-id=102 bgcolor=#d6d6d6
| 587102 ||  || — || October 8, 2005 || Kitt Peak || Spacewatch || 3:2 || align=right | 3.9 km || 
|-id=103 bgcolor=#E9E9E9
| 587103 ||  || — || September 29, 2005 || Kitt Peak || Spacewatch ||  || align=right data-sort-value="0.99" | 990 m || 
|-id=104 bgcolor=#E9E9E9
| 587104 ||  || — || October 8, 2005 || Kitt Peak || Spacewatch ||  || align=right data-sort-value="0.83" | 830 m || 
|-id=105 bgcolor=#d6d6d6
| 587105 ||  || — || October 1, 2005 || Catalina || CSS ||  || align=right | 2.6 km || 
|-id=106 bgcolor=#d6d6d6
| 587106 ||  || — || October 9, 2005 || Kitt Peak || Spacewatch ||  || align=right | 2.2 km || 
|-id=107 bgcolor=#fefefe
| 587107 ||  || — || October 3, 2005 || Catalina || CSS ||  || align=right data-sort-value="0.55" | 550 m || 
|-id=108 bgcolor=#d6d6d6
| 587108 ||  || — || August 25, 2005 || Palomar || NEAT ||  || align=right | 2.4 km || 
|-id=109 bgcolor=#d6d6d6
| 587109 ||  || — || October 4, 2005 || Palomar || NEAT ||  || align=right | 2.7 km || 
|-id=110 bgcolor=#d6d6d6
| 587110 ||  || — || October 3, 2005 || Kitt Peak || Spacewatch ||  || align=right | 2.5 km || 
|-id=111 bgcolor=#d6d6d6
| 587111 ||  || — || August 27, 2005 || Anderson Mesa || LONEOS || 3:2 || align=right | 4.4 km || 
|-id=112 bgcolor=#d6d6d6
| 587112 ||  || — || April 13, 2008 || Kitt Peak || Spacewatch ||  || align=right | 3.2 km || 
|-id=113 bgcolor=#d6d6d6
| 587113 ||  || — || January 10, 2007 || Kitt Peak || Spacewatch ||  || align=right | 2.6 km || 
|-id=114 bgcolor=#fefefe
| 587114 ||  || — || April 23, 2004 || Desert Eagle || W. K. Y. Yeung ||  || align=right data-sort-value="0.70" | 700 m || 
|-id=115 bgcolor=#d6d6d6
| 587115 ||  || — || September 11, 2010 || Mount Lemmon || Mount Lemmon Survey ||  || align=right | 2.5 km || 
|-id=116 bgcolor=#d6d6d6
| 587116 ||  || — || November 24, 2011 || Haleakala || Pan-STARRS ||  || align=right | 2.5 km || 
|-id=117 bgcolor=#d6d6d6
| 587117 ||  || — || October 1, 2005 || Kitt Peak || Spacewatch ||  || align=right | 2.0 km || 
|-id=118 bgcolor=#d6d6d6
| 587118 ||  || — || February 7, 2008 || Mount Lemmon || Mount Lemmon Survey ||  || align=right | 2.5 km || 
|-id=119 bgcolor=#d6d6d6
| 587119 ||  || — || December 24, 2006 || Kitt Peak || Spacewatch ||  || align=right | 2.7 km || 
|-id=120 bgcolor=#d6d6d6
| 587120 ||  || — || February 15, 2013 || ESA OGS || ESA OGS ||  || align=right | 2.4 km || 
|-id=121 bgcolor=#E9E9E9
| 587121 ||  || — || March 22, 2015 || Kitt Peak || Spacewatch ||  || align=right data-sort-value="0.64" | 640 m || 
|-id=122 bgcolor=#d6d6d6
| 587122 ||  || — || March 17, 2013 || Mount Lemmon || Mount Lemmon Survey ||  || align=right | 2.0 km || 
|-id=123 bgcolor=#fefefe
| 587123 ||  || — || March 13, 2007 || Nyukasa || H. Kurosaki, A. Nakajima ||  || align=right data-sort-value="0.64" | 640 m || 
|-id=124 bgcolor=#d6d6d6
| 587124 ||  || — || October 1, 2005 || Mount Lemmon || Mount Lemmon Survey ||  || align=right | 2.4 km || 
|-id=125 bgcolor=#d6d6d6
| 587125 ||  || — || October 7, 2005 || Kitt Peak || Spacewatch ||  || align=right | 2.3 km || 
|-id=126 bgcolor=#d6d6d6
| 587126 ||  || — || October 11, 2005 || Kitt Peak || Spacewatch ||  || align=right | 2.0 km || 
|-id=127 bgcolor=#E9E9E9
| 587127 ||  || — || October 11, 2005 || Kitt Peak || Spacewatch ||  || align=right data-sort-value="0.51" | 510 m || 
|-id=128 bgcolor=#d6d6d6
| 587128 ||  || — || October 25, 2005 || Mount Lemmon || Mount Lemmon Survey ||  || align=right | 2.0 km || 
|-id=129 bgcolor=#d6d6d6
| 587129 ||  || — || October 24, 2005 || Palomar || NEAT ||  || align=right | 2.3 km || 
|-id=130 bgcolor=#d6d6d6
| 587130 ||  || — || October 22, 2005 || Kitt Peak || Spacewatch ||  || align=right | 1.9 km || 
|-id=131 bgcolor=#d6d6d6
| 587131 ||  || — || October 22, 2005 || Kitt Peak || Spacewatch ||  || align=right | 2.2 km || 
|-id=132 bgcolor=#d6d6d6
| 587132 ||  || — || October 22, 2005 || Kitt Peak || Spacewatch ||  || align=right | 2.3 km || 
|-id=133 bgcolor=#d6d6d6
| 587133 ||  || — || October 24, 2005 || Kitt Peak || Spacewatch ||  || align=right | 2.8 km || 
|-id=134 bgcolor=#d6d6d6
| 587134 ||  || — || October 24, 2005 || Kitt Peak || Spacewatch ||  || align=right | 3.2 km || 
|-id=135 bgcolor=#d6d6d6
| 587135 ||  || — || October 25, 2005 || Mount Lemmon || Mount Lemmon Survey ||  || align=right | 2.6 km || 
|-id=136 bgcolor=#d6d6d6
| 587136 ||  || — || October 26, 2005 || Kitt Peak || Spacewatch ||  || align=right | 2.8 km || 
|-id=137 bgcolor=#d6d6d6
| 587137 ||  || — || September 29, 2005 || Mount Lemmon || Mount Lemmon Survey ||  || align=right | 2.7 km || 
|-id=138 bgcolor=#d6d6d6
| 587138 ||  || — || September 27, 2005 || Kitt Peak || Spacewatch ||  || align=right | 2.5 km || 
|-id=139 bgcolor=#d6d6d6
| 587139 ||  || — || October 24, 2005 || Kitt Peak || Spacewatch ||  || align=right | 2.5 km || 
|-id=140 bgcolor=#d6d6d6
| 587140 ||  || — || October 24, 2005 || Kitt Peak || Spacewatch ||  || align=right | 2.0 km || 
|-id=141 bgcolor=#E9E9E9
| 587141 ||  || — || October 24, 2005 || Kitt Peak || Spacewatch ||  || align=right data-sort-value="0.56" | 560 m || 
|-id=142 bgcolor=#fefefe
| 587142 ||  || — || October 1, 2005 || Catalina || CSS || H || align=right data-sort-value="0.73" | 730 m || 
|-id=143 bgcolor=#d6d6d6
| 587143 ||  || — || October 27, 2005 || Kitt Peak || Spacewatch ||  || align=right | 2.6 km || 
|-id=144 bgcolor=#d6d6d6
| 587144 ||  || — || October 25, 2005 || Kitt Peak || Spacewatch ||  || align=right | 2.2 km || 
|-id=145 bgcolor=#E9E9E9
| 587145 ||  || — || October 25, 2005 || Kitt Peak || Spacewatch ||  || align=right data-sort-value="0.70" | 700 m || 
|-id=146 bgcolor=#E9E9E9
| 587146 ||  || — || October 25, 2005 || Kitt Peak || Spacewatch ||  || align=right data-sort-value="0.68" | 680 m || 
|-id=147 bgcolor=#d6d6d6
| 587147 ||  || — || October 25, 2005 || Kitt Peak || Spacewatch ||  || align=right | 2.9 km || 
|-id=148 bgcolor=#d6d6d6
| 587148 ||  || — || October 27, 2005 || Kitt Peak || Spacewatch ||  || align=right | 2.5 km || 
|-id=149 bgcolor=#d6d6d6
| 587149 ||  || — || September 30, 2005 || Mount Lemmon || Mount Lemmon Survey ||  || align=right | 2.4 km || 
|-id=150 bgcolor=#fefefe
| 587150 ||  || — || October 22, 2005 || Kitt Peak || Spacewatch || H || align=right data-sort-value="0.49" | 490 m || 
|-id=151 bgcolor=#E9E9E9
| 587151 ||  || — || October 26, 2005 || Kitt Peak || Spacewatch ||  || align=right | 1.3 km || 
|-id=152 bgcolor=#d6d6d6
| 587152 ||  || — || October 26, 2005 || Kitt Peak || Spacewatch ||  || align=right | 2.6 km || 
|-id=153 bgcolor=#d6d6d6
| 587153 ||  || — || October 26, 2005 || Kitt Peak || Spacewatch ||  || align=right | 2.7 km || 
|-id=154 bgcolor=#E9E9E9
| 587154 ||  || — || October 29, 2005 || Catalina || CSS ||  || align=right data-sort-value="0.77" | 770 m || 
|-id=155 bgcolor=#d6d6d6
| 587155 ||  || — || October 27, 2005 || Kitt Peak || Spacewatch ||  || align=right | 2.1 km || 
|-id=156 bgcolor=#d6d6d6
| 587156 ||  || — || October 29, 2005 || Kitt Peak || Spacewatch ||  || align=right | 2.0 km || 
|-id=157 bgcolor=#E9E9E9
| 587157 ||  || — || October 29, 2005 || Kitt Peak || Spacewatch ||  || align=right data-sort-value="0.84" | 840 m || 
|-id=158 bgcolor=#E9E9E9
| 587158 ||  || — || October 30, 2005 || Kitt Peak || Spacewatch ||  || align=right data-sort-value="0.72" | 720 m || 
|-id=159 bgcolor=#d6d6d6
| 587159 ||  || — || October 31, 2005 || Kitt Peak || Spacewatch ||  || align=right | 2.7 km || 
|-id=160 bgcolor=#E9E9E9
| 587160 ||  || — || August 25, 2000 || Cerro Tololo || R. Millis, L. H. Wasserman ||  || align=right | 1.4 km || 
|-id=161 bgcolor=#d6d6d6
| 587161 ||  || — || October 30, 2005 || Kitt Peak || Spacewatch ||  || align=right | 2.6 km || 
|-id=162 bgcolor=#d6d6d6
| 587162 ||  || — || October 24, 2005 || Palomar || NEAT ||  || align=right | 2.4 km || 
|-id=163 bgcolor=#d6d6d6
| 587163 ||  || — || October 30, 2005 || Kitt Peak || Spacewatch ||  || align=right | 2.5 km || 
|-id=164 bgcolor=#d6d6d6
| 587164 ||  || — || October 22, 2005 || Kitt Peak || Spacewatch ||  || align=right | 2.1 km || 
|-id=165 bgcolor=#E9E9E9
| 587165 ||  || — || October 27, 2005 || Kitt Peak || Spacewatch ||  || align=right data-sort-value="0.67" | 670 m || 
|-id=166 bgcolor=#d6d6d6
| 587166 ||  || — || October 27, 2005 || Kitt Peak || Spacewatch ||  || align=right | 2.2 km || 
|-id=167 bgcolor=#E9E9E9
| 587167 ||  || — || October 22, 2005 || Kitt Peak || Spacewatch ||  || align=right data-sort-value="0.62" | 620 m || 
|-id=168 bgcolor=#d6d6d6
| 587168 ||  || — || October 22, 2005 || Kitt Peak || Spacewatch ||  || align=right | 2.5 km || 
|-id=169 bgcolor=#E9E9E9
| 587169 ||  || — || October 30, 2005 || Mount Lemmon || Mount Lemmon Survey ||  || align=right data-sort-value="0.76" | 760 m || 
|-id=170 bgcolor=#d6d6d6
| 587170 ||  || — || October 30, 2005 || Mount Lemmon || Mount Lemmon Survey ||  || align=right | 2.2 km || 
|-id=171 bgcolor=#fefefe
| 587171 ||  || — || October 29, 2005 || Mount Lemmon || Mount Lemmon Survey ||  || align=right data-sort-value="0.52" | 520 m || 
|-id=172 bgcolor=#d6d6d6
| 587172 ||  || — || October 29, 2005 || Kitt Peak || Spacewatch ||  || align=right | 2.1 km || 
|-id=173 bgcolor=#E9E9E9
| 587173 ||  || — || October 25, 2005 || Kitt Peak || Spacewatch ||  || align=right data-sort-value="0.66" | 660 m || 
|-id=174 bgcolor=#d6d6d6
| 587174 ||  || — || October 28, 2005 || Kitt Peak || Spacewatch ||  || align=right | 3.0 km || 
|-id=175 bgcolor=#d6d6d6
| 587175 ||  || — || October 28, 2005 || Kitt Peak || Spacewatch ||  || align=right | 3.0 km || 
|-id=176 bgcolor=#E9E9E9
| 587176 ||  || — || October 29, 2005 || Mount Lemmon || Mount Lemmon Survey ||  || align=right data-sort-value="0.70" | 700 m || 
|-id=177 bgcolor=#d6d6d6
| 587177 ||  || — || October 29, 2005 || Mount Lemmon || Mount Lemmon Survey ||  || align=right | 2.3 km || 
|-id=178 bgcolor=#d6d6d6
| 587178 ||  || — || October 23, 2005 || Catalina || CSS ||  || align=right | 2.6 km || 
|-id=179 bgcolor=#E9E9E9
| 587179 ||  || — || May 1, 2003 || Kitt Peak || Spacewatch ||  || align=right | 1.1 km || 
|-id=180 bgcolor=#E9E9E9
| 587180 ||  || — || October 27, 2005 || Mount Lemmon || Mount Lemmon Survey ||  || align=right data-sort-value="0.70" | 700 m || 
|-id=181 bgcolor=#d6d6d6
| 587181 ||  || — || October 30, 2005 || Mount Lemmon || Mount Lemmon Survey ||  || align=right | 2.5 km || 
|-id=182 bgcolor=#E9E9E9
| 587182 ||  || — || October 30, 2005 || Mount Lemmon || Mount Lemmon Survey ||  || align=right data-sort-value="0.97" | 970 m || 
|-id=183 bgcolor=#d6d6d6
| 587183 ||  || — || October 1, 2005 || Mount Lemmon || Mount Lemmon Survey ||  || align=right | 1.6 km || 
|-id=184 bgcolor=#d6d6d6
| 587184 ||  || — || February 13, 2002 || Apache Point || SDSS Collaboration ||  || align=right | 2.9 km || 
|-id=185 bgcolor=#d6d6d6
| 587185 ||  || — || December 27, 2011 || Mount Lemmon || Mount Lemmon Survey ||  || align=right | 2.2 km || 
|-id=186 bgcolor=#E9E9E9
| 587186 ||  || — || March 26, 2007 || Kitt Peak || Spacewatch ||  || align=right data-sort-value="0.76" | 760 m || 
|-id=187 bgcolor=#d6d6d6
| 587187 ||  || — || October 25, 2005 || Apache Point || SDSS Collaboration ||  || align=right | 2.6 km || 
|-id=188 bgcolor=#d6d6d6
| 587188 ||  || — || October 27, 2005 || Apache Point || SDSS Collaboration || HYG || align=right | 2.0 km || 
|-id=189 bgcolor=#d6d6d6
| 587189 ||  || — || October 27, 2005 || Catalina || CSS ||  || align=right | 2.8 km || 
|-id=190 bgcolor=#d6d6d6
| 587190 ||  || — || December 27, 2006 || Mount Lemmon || Mount Lemmon Survey ||  || align=right | 2.2 km || 
|-id=191 bgcolor=#d6d6d6
| 587191 ||  || — || October 25, 2005 || Kitt Peak || Spacewatch ||  || align=right | 2.1 km || 
|-id=192 bgcolor=#d6d6d6
| 587192 ||  || — || October 29, 2005 || Mount Lemmon || Mount Lemmon Survey ||  || align=right | 2.9 km || 
|-id=193 bgcolor=#d6d6d6
| 587193 ||  || — || October 30, 2005 || Mount Lemmon || Mount Lemmon Survey ||  || align=right | 2.8 km || 
|-id=194 bgcolor=#E9E9E9
| 587194 ||  || — || October 29, 2005 || Kitt Peak || Spacewatch ||  || align=right data-sort-value="0.74" | 740 m || 
|-id=195 bgcolor=#d6d6d6
| 587195 ||  || — || October 29, 2005 || Mount Lemmon || Mount Lemmon Survey ||  || align=right | 2.6 km || 
|-id=196 bgcolor=#d6d6d6
| 587196 ||  || — || November 24, 2011 || Mount Lemmon || Mount Lemmon Survey ||  || align=right | 2.4 km || 
|-id=197 bgcolor=#fefefe
| 587197 ||  || — || October 22, 2005 || Kitt Peak || Spacewatch ||  || align=right data-sort-value="0.79" | 790 m || 
|-id=198 bgcolor=#d6d6d6
| 587198 ||  || — || December 21, 2006 || Mount Lemmon || Mount Lemmon Survey ||  || align=right | 2.5 km || 
|-id=199 bgcolor=#E9E9E9
| 587199 ||  || — || October 15, 2013 || Mount Lemmon || Mount Lemmon Survey ||  || align=right | 1.2 km || 
|-id=200 bgcolor=#d6d6d6
| 587200 ||  || — || October 27, 2005 || Mount Lemmon || Mount Lemmon Survey ||  || align=right | 4.1 km || 
|}

587201–587300 

|-bgcolor=#E9E9E9
| 587201 ||  || — || October 26, 2009 || Kitt Peak || Spacewatch ||  || align=right data-sort-value="0.94" | 940 m || 
|-id=202 bgcolor=#d6d6d6
| 587202 ||  || — || October 1, 2010 || Kitt Peak || Spacewatch ||  || align=right | 2.1 km || 
|-id=203 bgcolor=#d6d6d6
| 587203 ||  || — || October 24, 2005 || Kitt Peak || Spacewatch ||  || align=right | 2.5 km || 
|-id=204 bgcolor=#d6d6d6
| 587204 ||  || — || August 12, 2010 || Kitt Peak || Spacewatch ||  || align=right | 2.0 km || 
|-id=205 bgcolor=#d6d6d6
| 587205 ||  || — || January 18, 2013 || Mount Lemmon || Mount Lemmon Survey ||  || align=right | 2.2 km || 
|-id=206 bgcolor=#d6d6d6
| 587206 ||  || — || October 29, 2005 || Kitt Peak || Spacewatch ||  || align=right | 2.6 km || 
|-id=207 bgcolor=#E9E9E9
| 587207 ||  || — || September 28, 2009 || Mount Lemmon || Mount Lemmon Survey ||  || align=right data-sort-value="0.93" | 930 m || 
|-id=208 bgcolor=#d6d6d6
| 587208 ||  || — || September 30, 2010 || Mount Lemmon || Mount Lemmon Survey ||  || align=right | 2.8 km || 
|-id=209 bgcolor=#d6d6d6
| 587209 ||  || — || July 19, 2015 || Haleakala || Pan-STARRS ||  || align=right | 2.7 km || 
|-id=210 bgcolor=#E9E9E9
| 587210 ||  || — || October 26, 2005 || Kitt Peak || Spacewatch ||  || align=right data-sort-value="0.94" | 940 m || 
|-id=211 bgcolor=#d6d6d6
| 587211 ||  || — || December 27, 2006 || Mount Lemmon || Mount Lemmon Survey ||  || align=right | 2.5 km || 
|-id=212 bgcolor=#E9E9E9
| 587212 ||  || — || October 25, 2005 || Mount Lemmon || Mount Lemmon Survey ||  || align=right data-sort-value="0.83" | 830 m || 
|-id=213 bgcolor=#d6d6d6
| 587213 ||  || — || April 10, 2014 || Haleakala || Pan-STARRS ||  || align=right | 2.2 km || 
|-id=214 bgcolor=#d6d6d6
| 587214 ||  || — || March 18, 2013 || Mount Lemmon || Mount Lemmon Survey ||  || align=right | 2.3 km || 
|-id=215 bgcolor=#d6d6d6
| 587215 ||  || — || October 9, 2015 || Haleakala || Pan-STARRS ||  || align=right | 1.7 km || 
|-id=216 bgcolor=#d6d6d6
| 587216 ||  || — || September 30, 2005 || Mount Lemmon || Mount Lemmon Survey ||  || align=right | 2.0 km || 
|-id=217 bgcolor=#E9E9E9
| 587217 ||  || — || October 27, 2005 || Kitt Peak || Spacewatch ||  || align=right | 1.8 km || 
|-id=218 bgcolor=#d6d6d6
| 587218 ||  || — || October 25, 2005 || Kitt Peak || Spacewatch ||  || align=right | 1.9 km || 
|-id=219 bgcolor=#E9E9E9
| 587219 ||  || — || October 22, 2005 || Kitt Peak || Spacewatch ||  || align=right data-sort-value="0.85" | 850 m || 
|-id=220 bgcolor=#fefefe
| 587220 ||  || — || October 27, 2005 || Kitt Peak || Spacewatch ||  || align=right data-sort-value="0.76" | 760 m || 
|-id=221 bgcolor=#fefefe
| 587221 ||  || — || October 28, 2005 || Kitt Peak || Spacewatch ||  || align=right data-sort-value="0.50" | 500 m || 
|-id=222 bgcolor=#d6d6d6
| 587222 ||  || — || November 3, 2005 || Mount Lemmon || Mount Lemmon Survey ||  || align=right | 2.7 km || 
|-id=223 bgcolor=#d6d6d6
| 587223 ||  || — || November 2, 2005 || Mount Lemmon || Mount Lemmon Survey ||  || align=right | 2.9 km || 
|-id=224 bgcolor=#d6d6d6
| 587224 ||  || — || October 12, 2005 || Kitt Peak || Spacewatch ||  || align=right | 2.4 km || 
|-id=225 bgcolor=#d6d6d6
| 587225 ||  || — || November 1, 2005 || Kitt Peak || Spacewatch ||  || align=right | 2.0 km || 
|-id=226 bgcolor=#E9E9E9
| 587226 ||  || — || November 4, 2005 || Kitt Peak || Spacewatch ||  || align=right data-sort-value="0.84" | 840 m || 
|-id=227 bgcolor=#fefefe
| 587227 ||  || — || November 1, 2005 || Kitt Peak || Spacewatch ||  || align=right data-sort-value="0.60" | 600 m || 
|-id=228 bgcolor=#d6d6d6
| 587228 ||  || — || November 3, 2005 || Mount Lemmon || Mount Lemmon Survey ||  || align=right | 2.2 km || 
|-id=229 bgcolor=#d6d6d6
| 587229 ||  || — || November 4, 2005 || Mount Lemmon || Mount Lemmon Survey ||  || align=right | 2.4 km || 
|-id=230 bgcolor=#d6d6d6
| 587230 ||  || — || November 2, 2005 || Socorro || LINEAR ||  || align=right | 2.5 km || 
|-id=231 bgcolor=#fefefe
| 587231 ||  || — || October 30, 2005 || Kitt Peak || Spacewatch ||  || align=right data-sort-value="0.57" | 570 m || 
|-id=232 bgcolor=#fefefe
| 587232 ||  || — || October 7, 2005 || Mount Lemmon || Mount Lemmon Survey ||  || align=right data-sort-value="0.68" | 680 m || 
|-id=233 bgcolor=#E9E9E9
| 587233 ||  || — || November 5, 2005 || Mount Lemmon || Mount Lemmon Survey ||  || align=right data-sort-value="0.73" | 730 m || 
|-id=234 bgcolor=#d6d6d6
| 587234 ||  || — || November 6, 2005 || Mount Lemmon || Mount Lemmon Survey ||  || align=right | 2.5 km || 
|-id=235 bgcolor=#E9E9E9
| 587235 ||  || — || October 30, 2005 || Mount Lemmon || Mount Lemmon Survey ||  || align=right data-sort-value="0.87" | 870 m || 
|-id=236 bgcolor=#E9E9E9
| 587236 ||  || — || October 27, 2005 || Kitt Peak || Spacewatch ||  || align=right | 1.3 km || 
|-id=237 bgcolor=#E9E9E9
| 587237 ||  || — || November 4, 2005 || Mount Lemmon || Mount Lemmon Survey ||  || align=right data-sort-value="0.74" | 740 m || 
|-id=238 bgcolor=#E9E9E9
| 587238 ||  || — || November 6, 2005 || Kitt Peak || Spacewatch ||  || align=right data-sort-value="0.81" | 810 m || 
|-id=239 bgcolor=#d6d6d6
| 587239 ||  || — || October 25, 2005 || Kitt Peak || Spacewatch ||  || align=right | 2.1 km || 
|-id=240 bgcolor=#E9E9E9
| 587240 ||  || — || October 29, 2005 || Kitt Peak || Spacewatch ||  || align=right | 1.0 km || 
|-id=241 bgcolor=#d6d6d6
| 587241 ||  || — || November 6, 2005 || Mount Lemmon || Mount Lemmon Survey ||  || align=right | 2.6 km || 
|-id=242 bgcolor=#d6d6d6
| 587242 ||  || — || November 6, 2005 || Mount Lemmon || Mount Lemmon Survey ||  || align=right | 2.2 km || 
|-id=243 bgcolor=#d6d6d6
| 587243 ||  || — || November 6, 2005 || Kitt Peak || Spacewatch ||  || align=right | 2.7 km || 
|-id=244 bgcolor=#d6d6d6
| 587244 ||  || — || November 6, 2005 || Kitt Peak || Spacewatch ||  || align=right | 2.6 km || 
|-id=245 bgcolor=#d6d6d6
| 587245 ||  || — || April 9, 2002 || Palomar || NEAT ||  || align=right | 2.5 km || 
|-id=246 bgcolor=#d6d6d6
| 587246 ||  || — || November 11, 2005 || Kitt Peak || Spacewatch ||  || align=right | 3.2 km || 
|-id=247 bgcolor=#d6d6d6
| 587247 ||  || — || November 11, 2005 || Kitt Peak || Spacewatch ||  || align=right | 2.2 km || 
|-id=248 bgcolor=#fefefe
| 587248 ||  || — || November 7, 2005 || Mauna Kea || Mauna Kea Obs. ||  || align=right data-sort-value="0.66" | 660 m || 
|-id=249 bgcolor=#d6d6d6
| 587249 ||  || — || November 12, 2005 || Kitt Peak || Spacewatch ||  || align=right | 3.7 km || 
|-id=250 bgcolor=#fefefe
| 587250 ||  || — || November 1, 2005 || Mount Lemmon || Mount Lemmon Survey ||  || align=right data-sort-value="0.57" | 570 m || 
|-id=251 bgcolor=#fefefe
| 587251 ||  || — || November 1, 2005 || Mount Lemmon || Mount Lemmon Survey ||  || align=right data-sort-value="0.55" | 550 m || 
|-id=252 bgcolor=#d6d6d6
| 587252 ||  || — || November 6, 2005 || Kitt Peak || Spacewatch ||  || align=right | 3.2 km || 
|-id=253 bgcolor=#d6d6d6
| 587253 ||  || — || November 12, 2005 || Kitt Peak || Spacewatch ||  || align=right | 2.4 km || 
|-id=254 bgcolor=#d6d6d6
| 587254 ||  || — || November 3, 2005 || Kitt Peak || Spacewatch ||  || align=right | 2.7 km || 
|-id=255 bgcolor=#d6d6d6
| 587255 ||  || — || November 11, 2005 || Kitt Peak || Spacewatch ||  || align=right | 2.8 km || 
|-id=256 bgcolor=#E9E9E9
| 587256 ||  || — || March 13, 2012 || Mount Lemmon || Mount Lemmon Survey ||  || align=right | 1.9 km || 
|-id=257 bgcolor=#E9E9E9
| 587257 ||  || — || September 29, 2009 || Mount Lemmon || Mount Lemmon Survey ||  || align=right | 1.0 km || 
|-id=258 bgcolor=#d6d6d6
| 587258 ||  || — || January 29, 2012 || Haleakala || Pan-STARRS ||  || align=right | 2.4 km || 
|-id=259 bgcolor=#E9E9E9
| 587259 ||  || — || November 12, 2005 || Kitt Peak || Spacewatch ||  || align=right | 1.3 km || 
|-id=260 bgcolor=#d6d6d6
| 587260 ||  || — || April 15, 2008 || Mount Lemmon || Mount Lemmon Survey ||  || align=right | 3.1 km || 
|-id=261 bgcolor=#d6d6d6
| 587261 ||  || — || November 3, 2005 || Kitt Peak || Spacewatch ||  || align=right | 2.4 km || 
|-id=262 bgcolor=#E9E9E9
| 587262 ||  || — || September 28, 2009 || Kitt Peak || Spacewatch ||  || align=right data-sort-value="0.80" | 800 m || 
|-id=263 bgcolor=#fefefe
| 587263 ||  || — || June 7, 2014 || Haleakala || Pan-STARRS ||  || align=right data-sort-value="0.55" | 550 m || 
|-id=264 bgcolor=#d6d6d6
| 587264 ||  || — || February 15, 2013 || Haleakala || Pan-STARRS ||  || align=right | 2.4 km || 
|-id=265 bgcolor=#d6d6d6
| 587265 ||  || — || November 10, 2005 || Mount Lemmon || Mount Lemmon Survey ||  || align=right | 2.5 km || 
|-id=266 bgcolor=#E9E9E9
| 587266 ||  || — || November 7, 2005 || Mauna Kea || Mauna Kea Obs. ||  || align=right | 1.1 km || 
|-id=267 bgcolor=#d6d6d6
| 587267 ||  || — || November 12, 2005 || Kitt Peak || Spacewatch ||  || align=right | 2.3 km || 
|-id=268 bgcolor=#d6d6d6
| 587268 ||  || — || November 22, 2005 || Kitt Peak || Spacewatch ||  || align=right | 2.2 km || 
|-id=269 bgcolor=#E9E9E9
| 587269 ||  || — || November 25, 2005 || Mount Lemmon || Mount Lemmon Survey ||  || align=right | 1.6 km || 
|-id=270 bgcolor=#E9E9E9
| 587270 ||  || — || November 10, 2005 || Mount Lemmon || Mount Lemmon Survey ||  || align=right data-sort-value="0.84" | 840 m || 
|-id=271 bgcolor=#E9E9E9
| 587271 ||  || — || November 21, 2005 || Kitt Peak || Spacewatch ||  || align=right | 1.3 km || 
|-id=272 bgcolor=#d6d6d6
| 587272 ||  || — || April 7, 2002 || Cerro Tololo || M. W. Buie, A. B. Jordan || THM || align=right | 1.9 km || 
|-id=273 bgcolor=#fefefe
| 587273 ||  || — || November 26, 2005 || Mount Lemmon || Mount Lemmon Survey ||  || align=right data-sort-value="0.52" | 520 m || 
|-id=274 bgcolor=#E9E9E9
| 587274 ||  || — || November 26, 2005 || Kitt Peak || Spacewatch ||  || align=right data-sort-value="0.68" | 680 m || 
|-id=275 bgcolor=#d6d6d6
| 587275 ||  || — || November 26, 2005 || Kitt Peak || Spacewatch ||  || align=right | 2.4 km || 
|-id=276 bgcolor=#fefefe
| 587276 ||  || — || November 29, 2005 || Anderson Mesa || LONEOS || H || align=right data-sort-value="0.45" | 450 m || 
|-id=277 bgcolor=#d6d6d6
| 587277 ||  || — || November 22, 2005 || Kitt Peak || Spacewatch ||  || align=right | 3.1 km || 
|-id=278 bgcolor=#E9E9E9
| 587278 ||  || — || July 29, 2000 || Cerro Tololo || M. W. Buie, S. D. Kern ||  || align=right data-sort-value="0.96" | 960 m || 
|-id=279 bgcolor=#d6d6d6
| 587279 ||  || — || November 25, 2005 || Kitt Peak || Spacewatch ||  || align=right | 2.2 km || 
|-id=280 bgcolor=#d6d6d6
| 587280 ||  || — || November 25, 2005 || Mount Lemmon || Mount Lemmon Survey ||  || align=right | 3.0 km || 
|-id=281 bgcolor=#d6d6d6
| 587281 ||  || — || November 25, 2005 || Mount Lemmon || Mount Lemmon Survey ||  || align=right | 2.5 km || 
|-id=282 bgcolor=#E9E9E9
| 587282 ||  || — || October 27, 2005 || Kitt Peak || Spacewatch ||  || align=right | 1.2 km || 
|-id=283 bgcolor=#E9E9E9
| 587283 ||  || — || November 26, 2005 || Mount Lemmon || Mount Lemmon Survey ||  || align=right data-sort-value="0.78" | 780 m || 
|-id=284 bgcolor=#d6d6d6
| 587284 ||  || — || October 30, 2005 || Mount Lemmon || Mount Lemmon Survey || LIX || align=right | 2.7 km || 
|-id=285 bgcolor=#d6d6d6
| 587285 ||  || — || November 6, 2005 || Mount Lemmon || Mount Lemmon Survey ||  || align=right | 2.6 km || 
|-id=286 bgcolor=#d6d6d6
| 587286 ||  || — || November 29, 2005 || Mount Lemmon || Mount Lemmon Survey ||  || align=right | 2.7 km || 
|-id=287 bgcolor=#E9E9E9
| 587287 ||  || — || November 10, 2005 || Kitt Peak || Spacewatch ||  || align=right | 1.1 km || 
|-id=288 bgcolor=#d6d6d6
| 587288 ||  || — || November 30, 2005 || Kitt Peak || Spacewatch ||  || align=right | 2.2 km || 
|-id=289 bgcolor=#d6d6d6
| 587289 ||  || — || October 30, 2005 || Mount Lemmon || Mount Lemmon Survey ||  || align=right | 2.4 km || 
|-id=290 bgcolor=#d6d6d6
| 587290 ||  || — || November 30, 2005 || Mount Lemmon || Mount Lemmon Survey ||  || align=right | 2.6 km || 
|-id=291 bgcolor=#fefefe
| 587291 ||  || — || November 30, 2005 || Kitt Peak || Spacewatch ||  || align=right data-sort-value="0.58" | 580 m || 
|-id=292 bgcolor=#d6d6d6
| 587292 ||  || — || November 30, 2005 || Kitt Peak || Spacewatch ||  || align=right | 2.9 km || 
|-id=293 bgcolor=#E9E9E9
| 587293 ||  || — || November 30, 2005 || Kitt Peak || Spacewatch ||  || align=right data-sort-value="0.91" | 910 m || 
|-id=294 bgcolor=#E9E9E9
| 587294 ||  || — || November 30, 2005 || Anderson Mesa || LONEOS ||  || align=right | 1.1 km || 
|-id=295 bgcolor=#d6d6d6
| 587295 ||  || — || November 30, 2005 || Kitt Peak || Spacewatch ||  || align=right | 2.7 km || 
|-id=296 bgcolor=#E9E9E9
| 587296 ||  || — || November 30, 2005 || Kitt Peak || Spacewatch ||  || align=right data-sort-value="0.92" | 920 m || 
|-id=297 bgcolor=#E9E9E9
| 587297 ||  || — || November 25, 2005 || Mount Lemmon || Mount Lemmon Survey ||  || align=right | 1.0 km || 
|-id=298 bgcolor=#E9E9E9
| 587298 ||  || — || September 30, 2005 || Mount Lemmon || Mount Lemmon Survey ||  || align=right | 1.2 km || 
|-id=299 bgcolor=#E9E9E9
| 587299 ||  || — || November 24, 2005 || Mauna Kea || Mauna Kea Obs. ||  || align=right data-sort-value="0.77" | 770 m || 
|-id=300 bgcolor=#fefefe
| 587300 ||  || — || October 25, 2005 || Mount Lemmon || Mount Lemmon Survey ||  || align=right data-sort-value="0.45" | 450 m || 
|}

587301–587400 

|-bgcolor=#E9E9E9
| 587301 ||  || — || November 22, 2005 || Kitt Peak || Spacewatch ||  || align=right | 1.3 km || 
|-id=302 bgcolor=#d6d6d6
| 587302 ||  || — || November 26, 2005 || Mount Lemmon || Mount Lemmon Survey ||  || align=right | 2.4 km || 
|-id=303 bgcolor=#d6d6d6
| 587303 ||  || — || September 17, 2012 || Mount Lemmon || Mount Lemmon Survey || 3:2 || align=right | 3.6 km || 
|-id=304 bgcolor=#d6d6d6
| 587304 ||  || — || November 25, 2005 || Kitt Peak || Spacewatch ||  || align=right | 2.9 km || 
|-id=305 bgcolor=#d6d6d6
| 587305 ||  || — || November 26, 2005 || Catalina || CSS ||  || align=right | 2.4 km || 
|-id=306 bgcolor=#d6d6d6
| 587306 ||  || — || November 24, 2005 || Palomar || NEAT || Tj (2.99) || align=right | 3.7 km || 
|-id=307 bgcolor=#d6d6d6
| 587307 ||  || — || October 31, 2016 || Mount Lemmon || Mount Lemmon Survey ||  || align=right | 3.0 km || 
|-id=308 bgcolor=#E9E9E9
| 587308 ||  || — || November 26, 2005 || Mount Lemmon || Mount Lemmon Survey ||  || align=right data-sort-value="0.82" | 820 m || 
|-id=309 bgcolor=#E9E9E9
| 587309 ||  || — || April 12, 2016 || Haleakala || Pan-STARRS ||  || align=right data-sort-value="0.73" | 730 m || 
|-id=310 bgcolor=#fefefe
| 587310 ||  || — || November 14, 1995 || Kitt Peak || Spacewatch ||  || align=right data-sort-value="0.45" | 450 m || 
|-id=311 bgcolor=#fefefe
| 587311 ||  || — || November 21, 2005 || Kitt Peak || Spacewatch ||  || align=right data-sort-value="0.50" | 500 m || 
|-id=312 bgcolor=#d6d6d6
| 587312 ||  || — || November 29, 2005 || Mount Lemmon || Mount Lemmon Survey ||  || align=right | 2.5 km || 
|-id=313 bgcolor=#d6d6d6
| 587313 ||  || — || December 1, 2005 || Kitt Peak || Spacewatch ||  || align=right | 2.6 km || 
|-id=314 bgcolor=#d6d6d6
| 587314 ||  || — || December 2, 2005 || Kitt Peak || Spacewatch ||  || align=right | 3.2 km || 
|-id=315 bgcolor=#E9E9E9
| 587315 ||  || — || December 3, 2005 || Kitt Peak || Spacewatch ||  || align=right | 1.1 km || 
|-id=316 bgcolor=#d6d6d6
| 587316 ||  || — || November 30, 2005 || Kitt Peak || Spacewatch ||  || align=right | 3.3 km || 
|-id=317 bgcolor=#E9E9E9
| 587317 ||  || — || December 4, 2005 || Kitt Peak || Spacewatch ||  || align=right data-sort-value="0.80" | 800 m || 
|-id=318 bgcolor=#E9E9E9
| 587318 ||  || — || December 5, 2005 || Mount Lemmon || Mount Lemmon Survey ||  || align=right data-sort-value="0.86" | 860 m || 
|-id=319 bgcolor=#d6d6d6
| 587319 ||  || — || November 21, 2005 || Kitt Peak || Spacewatch ||  || align=right | 3.0 km || 
|-id=320 bgcolor=#d6d6d6
| 587320 ||  || — || December 2, 2005 || Kitt Peak || Spacewatch ||  || align=right | 2.3 km || 
|-id=321 bgcolor=#E9E9E9
| 587321 ||  || — || December 2, 2005 || Kitt Peak || Spacewatch ||  || align=right data-sort-value="0.91" | 910 m || 
|-id=322 bgcolor=#d6d6d6
| 587322 ||  || — || December 2, 2005 || Kitt Peak || Spacewatch ||  || align=right | 2.2 km || 
|-id=323 bgcolor=#d6d6d6
| 587323 ||  || — || December 6, 2005 || Kitt Peak || Spacewatch ||  || align=right | 2.7 km || 
|-id=324 bgcolor=#E9E9E9
| 587324 ||  || — || December 6, 2005 || Kitt Peak || Spacewatch ||  || align=right data-sort-value="0.84" | 840 m || 
|-id=325 bgcolor=#d6d6d6
| 587325 ||  || — || December 6, 2005 || Kitt Peak || Spacewatch ||  || align=right | 3.0 km || 
|-id=326 bgcolor=#d6d6d6
| 587326 ||  || — || December 6, 2005 || Kitt Peak || Spacewatch ||  || align=right | 3.2 km || 
|-id=327 bgcolor=#d6d6d6
| 587327 ||  || — || December 8, 2005 || Kitt Peak || Spacewatch ||  || align=right | 3.3 km || 
|-id=328 bgcolor=#d6d6d6
| 587328 ||  || — || December 1, 2005 || Catalina || CSS ||  || align=right | 3.1 km || 
|-id=329 bgcolor=#d6d6d6
| 587329 ||  || — || December 1, 2005 || Kitt Peak || L. H. Wasserman, R. Millis ||  || align=right | 2.2 km || 
|-id=330 bgcolor=#d6d6d6
| 587330 ||  || — || December 1, 2005 || Kitt Peak || L. H. Wasserman, R. Millis || VER || align=right | 2.2 km || 
|-id=331 bgcolor=#fefefe
| 587331 ||  || — || December 3, 2005 || Mauna Kea || Mauna Kea Obs. ||  || align=right data-sort-value="0.52" | 520 m || 
|-id=332 bgcolor=#d6d6d6
| 587332 ||  || — || October 1, 2005 || Mount Lemmon || Mount Lemmon Survey ||  || align=right | 2.6 km || 
|-id=333 bgcolor=#d6d6d6
| 587333 ||  || — || October 28, 2005 || Mount Lemmon || Mount Lemmon Survey ||  || align=right | 2.2 km || 
|-id=334 bgcolor=#E9E9E9
| 587334 ||  || — || March 26, 2007 || Mount Lemmon || Mount Lemmon Survey ||  || align=right data-sort-value="0.98" | 980 m || 
|-id=335 bgcolor=#d6d6d6
| 587335 ||  || — || December 5, 2005 || Kitt Peak || Spacewatch ||  || align=right | 3.2 km || 
|-id=336 bgcolor=#d6d6d6
| 587336 ||  || — || November 4, 2010 || La Sagra || OAM Obs. ||  || align=right | 3.3 km || 
|-id=337 bgcolor=#d6d6d6
| 587337 ||  || — || October 7, 2016 || Mount Lemmon || Mount Lemmon Survey ||  || align=right | 2.5 km || 
|-id=338 bgcolor=#d6d6d6
| 587338 ||  || — || November 4, 2016 || Haleakala || Pan-STARRS ||  || align=right | 2.3 km || 
|-id=339 bgcolor=#d6d6d6
| 587339 ||  || — || July 19, 2015 || Haleakala || Pan-STARRS ||  || align=right | 2.4 km || 
|-id=340 bgcolor=#d6d6d6
| 587340 ||  || — || December 10, 2005 || Kitt Peak || Spacewatch ||  || align=right | 3.9 km || 
|-id=341 bgcolor=#d6d6d6
| 587341 ||  || — || May 11, 2002 || Socorro || LINEAR ||  || align=right | 3.1 km || 
|-id=342 bgcolor=#d6d6d6
| 587342 ||  || — || November 25, 2005 || Kitt Peak || Spacewatch ||  || align=right | 2.9 km || 
|-id=343 bgcolor=#E9E9E9
| 587343 ||  || — || November 3, 2005 || Mount Lemmon || Mount Lemmon Survey ||  || align=right | 1.2 km || 
|-id=344 bgcolor=#d6d6d6
| 587344 ||  || — || October 28, 2016 || Haleakala || Pan-STARRS ||  || align=right | 2.6 km || 
|-id=345 bgcolor=#E9E9E9
| 587345 ||  || — || March 1, 2011 || Catalina || CSS ||  || align=right | 1.6 km || 
|-id=346 bgcolor=#fefefe
| 587346 ||  || — || February 3, 2013 || Haleakala || Pan-STARRS ||  || align=right data-sort-value="0.63" | 630 m || 
|-id=347 bgcolor=#fefefe
| 587347 ||  || — || April 6, 2010 || Catalina || CSS ||  || align=right data-sort-value="0.57" | 570 m || 
|-id=348 bgcolor=#d6d6d6
| 587348 ||  || — || December 5, 2005 || Mount Lemmon || Mount Lemmon Survey ||  || align=right | 2.6 km || 
|-id=349 bgcolor=#d6d6d6
| 587349 ||  || — || July 28, 2015 || Haleakala || Pan-STARRS ||  || align=right | 2.8 km || 
|-id=350 bgcolor=#d6d6d6
| 587350 ||  || — || December 1, 2005 || Mount Lemmon || Mount Lemmon Survey ||  || align=right | 2.6 km || 
|-id=351 bgcolor=#fefefe
| 587351 ||  || — || December 2, 2005 || Mount Lemmon || Mount Lemmon Survey ||  || align=right data-sort-value="0.54" | 540 m || 
|-id=352 bgcolor=#d6d6d6
| 587352 ||  || — || December 25, 2005 || Kitt Peak || Spacewatch ||  || align=right | 3.0 km || 
|-id=353 bgcolor=#d6d6d6
| 587353 ||  || — || December 26, 2005 || Mount Lemmon || Mount Lemmon Survey ||  || align=right | 2.8 km || 
|-id=354 bgcolor=#E9E9E9
| 587354 ||  || — || September 21, 2000 || Kitt Peak || Spacewatch ||  || align=right data-sort-value="0.70" | 700 m || 
|-id=355 bgcolor=#d6d6d6
| 587355 ||  || — || December 22, 2005 || Kitt Peak || Spacewatch ||  || align=right | 3.6 km || 
|-id=356 bgcolor=#d6d6d6
| 587356 ||  || — || December 25, 2005 || Kitt Peak || Spacewatch ||  || align=right | 2.4 km || 
|-id=357 bgcolor=#E9E9E9
| 587357 ||  || — || November 10, 2005 || Mount Lemmon || Mount Lemmon Survey ||  || align=right data-sort-value="0.72" | 720 m || 
|-id=358 bgcolor=#d6d6d6
| 587358 ||  || — || December 24, 2005 || Kitt Peak || Spacewatch ||  || align=right | 3.4 km || 
|-id=359 bgcolor=#d6d6d6
| 587359 ||  || — || December 5, 2005 || Mount Lemmon || Mount Lemmon Survey ||  || align=right | 3.3 km || 
|-id=360 bgcolor=#d6d6d6
| 587360 ||  || — || December 24, 2005 || Kitt Peak || Spacewatch ||  || align=right | 2.9 km || 
|-id=361 bgcolor=#d6d6d6
| 587361 ||  || — || December 5, 2005 || Kitt Peak || Spacewatch ||  || align=right | 3.4 km || 
|-id=362 bgcolor=#E9E9E9
| 587362 ||  || — || December 25, 2005 || Mount Lemmon || Mount Lemmon Survey ||  || align=right data-sort-value="0.94" | 940 m || 
|-id=363 bgcolor=#d6d6d6
| 587363 ||  || — || December 28, 2005 || Kitt Peak || Spacewatch ||  || align=right | 2.4 km || 
|-id=364 bgcolor=#d6d6d6
| 587364 ||  || — || December 24, 2005 || Kitt Peak || Spacewatch ||  || align=right | 2.8 km || 
|-id=365 bgcolor=#E9E9E9
| 587365 ||  || — || December 6, 2005 || Kitt Peak || Spacewatch ||  || align=right data-sort-value="0.95" | 950 m || 
|-id=366 bgcolor=#d6d6d6
| 587366 ||  || — || December 26, 2005 || Kitt Peak || Spacewatch ||  || align=right | 2.1 km || 
|-id=367 bgcolor=#E9E9E9
| 587367 ||  || — || December 28, 2005 || Mount Lemmon || Mount Lemmon Survey ||  || align=right | 1.1 km || 
|-id=368 bgcolor=#d6d6d6
| 587368 ||  || — || December 28, 2005 || Mount Lemmon || Mount Lemmon Survey ||  || align=right | 2.9 km || 
|-id=369 bgcolor=#E9E9E9
| 587369 ||  || — || November 26, 2005 || Mount Lemmon || Mount Lemmon Survey ||  || align=right data-sort-value="0.69" | 690 m || 
|-id=370 bgcolor=#d6d6d6
| 587370 ||  || — || December 25, 2005 || Mount Lemmon || Mount Lemmon Survey ||  || align=right | 4.4 km || 
|-id=371 bgcolor=#d6d6d6
| 587371 ||  || — || December 27, 2005 || Kitt Peak || Spacewatch ||  || align=right | 3.0 km || 
|-id=372 bgcolor=#E9E9E9
| 587372 ||  || — || December 27, 2005 || Mount Lemmon || Mount Lemmon Survey ||  || align=right | 1.2 km || 
|-id=373 bgcolor=#d6d6d6
| 587373 ||  || — || December 27, 2005 || Kitt Peak || Spacewatch ||  || align=right | 2.2 km || 
|-id=374 bgcolor=#d6d6d6
| 587374 ||  || — || December 28, 2005 || Kitt Peak || Spacewatch ||  || align=right | 2.8 km || 
|-id=375 bgcolor=#d6d6d6
| 587375 ||  || — || December 29, 2005 || Kitt Peak || Spacewatch ||  || align=right | 2.2 km || 
|-id=376 bgcolor=#d6d6d6
| 587376 ||  || — || December 30, 2005 || Kitt Peak || Spacewatch ||  || align=right | 2.7 km || 
|-id=377 bgcolor=#d6d6d6
| 587377 ||  || — || December 2, 2005 || Mount Lemmon || Mount Lemmon Survey ||  || align=right | 2.9 km || 
|-id=378 bgcolor=#d6d6d6
| 587378 ||  || — || December 28, 2005 || Kitt Peak || Spacewatch ||  || align=right | 4.5 km || 
|-id=379 bgcolor=#fefefe
| 587379 ||  || — || December 29, 2005 || Mount Lemmon || Mount Lemmon Survey ||  || align=right data-sort-value="0.56" | 560 m || 
|-id=380 bgcolor=#d6d6d6
| 587380 ||  || — || December 2, 2005 || Kitt Peak || Spacewatch ||  || align=right | 2.1 km || 
|-id=381 bgcolor=#E9E9E9
| 587381 ||  || — || December 4, 2005 || Kitt Peak || Spacewatch ||  || align=right | 1.2 km || 
|-id=382 bgcolor=#d6d6d6
| 587382 ||  || — || December 25, 2005 || Kitt Peak || Spacewatch ||  || align=right | 2.7 km || 
|-id=383 bgcolor=#E9E9E9
| 587383 ||  || — || December 25, 2005 || Kitt Peak || Spacewatch ||  || align=right | 1.1 km || 
|-id=384 bgcolor=#d6d6d6
| 587384 ||  || — || November 30, 2005 || Kitt Peak || Spacewatch ||  || align=right | 2.3 km || 
|-id=385 bgcolor=#E9E9E9
| 587385 ||  || — || December 28, 2005 || Kitt Peak || Spacewatch ||  || align=right data-sort-value="0.93" | 930 m || 
|-id=386 bgcolor=#d6d6d6
| 587386 ||  || — || October 6, 2004 || Kitt Peak || Spacewatch ||  || align=right | 2.8 km || 
|-id=387 bgcolor=#d6d6d6
| 587387 ||  || — || December 1, 2005 || Kitt Peak || Spacewatch ||  || align=right | 2.7 km || 
|-id=388 bgcolor=#d6d6d6
| 587388 ||  || — || December 28, 2005 || Mount Lemmon || Mount Lemmon Survey ||  || align=right | 2.7 km || 
|-id=389 bgcolor=#fefefe
| 587389 ||  || — || December 29, 2005 || Kitt Peak || Spacewatch ||  || align=right data-sort-value="0.47" | 470 m || 
|-id=390 bgcolor=#d6d6d6
| 587390 ||  || — || December 30, 2005 || Kitt Peak || Spacewatch ||  || align=right | 3.2 km || 
|-id=391 bgcolor=#E9E9E9
| 587391 ||  || — || December 24, 2005 || Kitt Peak || Spacewatch ||  || align=right | 1.4 km || 
|-id=392 bgcolor=#d6d6d6
| 587392 ||  || — || December 24, 2005 || Kitt Peak || Spacewatch ||  || align=right | 2.9 km || 
|-id=393 bgcolor=#E9E9E9
| 587393 ||  || — || December 25, 2005 || Kitt Peak || Spacewatch ||  || align=right | 1.3 km || 
|-id=394 bgcolor=#d6d6d6
| 587394 ||  || — || December 27, 2005 || Kitt Peak || Spacewatch ||  || align=right | 2.8 km || 
|-id=395 bgcolor=#d6d6d6
| 587395 ||  || — || November 6, 2005 || Kitt Peak || Spacewatch ||  || align=right | 3.6 km || 
|-id=396 bgcolor=#d6d6d6
| 587396 ||  || — || December 25, 2005 || Kitt Peak || Spacewatch ||  || align=right | 3.0 km || 
|-id=397 bgcolor=#E9E9E9
| 587397 ||  || — || April 29, 2003 || Kitt Peak || Spacewatch ||  || align=right | 1.3 km || 
|-id=398 bgcolor=#d6d6d6
| 587398 ||  || — || August 21, 2004 || Siding Spring || SSS ||  || align=right | 3.1 km || 
|-id=399 bgcolor=#d6d6d6
| 587399 ||  || — || December 10, 2005 || Kitt Peak || Spacewatch ||  || align=right | 3.4 km || 
|-id=400 bgcolor=#d6d6d6
| 587400 ||  || — || December 25, 2005 || Kitt Peak || Spacewatch ||  || align=right | 1.9 km || 
|}

587401–587500 

|-bgcolor=#d6d6d6
| 587401 ||  || — || February 22, 2012 || Catalina || CSS ||  || align=right | 2.3 km || 
|-id=402 bgcolor=#E9E9E9
| 587402 ||  || — || September 27, 2017 || Mount Lemmon || Mount Lemmon Survey ||  || align=right | 1.2 km || 
|-id=403 bgcolor=#d6d6d6
| 587403 ||  || — || November 25, 2005 || Kitt Peak || Spacewatch ||  || align=right | 2.8 km || 
|-id=404 bgcolor=#E9E9E9
| 587404 ||  || — || October 11, 2009 || Mount Lemmon || Mount Lemmon Survey ||  || align=right data-sort-value="0.64" | 640 m || 
|-id=405 bgcolor=#d6d6d6
| 587405 ||  || — || December 28, 2005 || Mount Lemmon || Mount Lemmon Survey || 7:4* || align=right | 2.5 km || 
|-id=406 bgcolor=#d6d6d6
| 587406 ||  || — || November 11, 2016 || Mount Lemmon || Mount Lemmon Survey ||  || align=right | 2.9 km || 
|-id=407 bgcolor=#d6d6d6
| 587407 ||  || — || December 24, 2005 || Kitt Peak || Spacewatch ||  || align=right | 2.4 km || 
|-id=408 bgcolor=#d6d6d6
| 587408 ||  || — || February 15, 2013 || Haleakala || Pan-STARRS ||  || align=right | 2.9 km || 
|-id=409 bgcolor=#E9E9E9
| 587409 ||  || — || December 30, 2005 || Kitt Peak || Spacewatch ||  || align=right | 1.3 km || 
|-id=410 bgcolor=#d6d6d6
| 587410 ||  || — || January 2, 2006 || Catalina || CSS ||  || align=right | 3.1 km || 
|-id=411 bgcolor=#E9E9E9
| 587411 ||  || — || January 4, 2006 || Kitt Peak || Spacewatch ||  || align=right | 1.4 km || 
|-id=412 bgcolor=#d6d6d6
| 587412 ||  || — || January 5, 2006 || Mount Lemmon || Mount Lemmon Survey ||  || align=right | 2.8 km || 
|-id=413 bgcolor=#E9E9E9
| 587413 ||  || — || January 5, 2006 || Catalina || CSS ||  || align=right data-sort-value="0.83" | 830 m || 
|-id=414 bgcolor=#E9E9E9
| 587414 ||  || — || January 6, 2006 || Catalina || CSS ||  || align=right | 1.2 km || 
|-id=415 bgcolor=#E9E9E9
| 587415 ||  || — || December 25, 2005 || Kitt Peak || Spacewatch ||  || align=right data-sort-value="0.98" | 980 m || 
|-id=416 bgcolor=#d6d6d6
| 587416 ||  || — || January 4, 2006 || Kitt Peak || Spacewatch ||  || align=right | 2.6 km || 
|-id=417 bgcolor=#E9E9E9
| 587417 ||  || — || January 7, 2006 || Mount Lemmon || Mount Lemmon Survey ||  || align=right data-sort-value="0.81" | 810 m || 
|-id=418 bgcolor=#d6d6d6
| 587418 ||  || — || January 4, 2006 || Kitt Peak || Spacewatch || THM || align=right | 2.1 km || 
|-id=419 bgcolor=#E9E9E9
| 587419 ||  || — || December 28, 2005 || Kitt Peak || Spacewatch ||  || align=right | 1.1 km || 
|-id=420 bgcolor=#E9E9E9
| 587420 ||  || — || December 28, 2005 || Kitt Peak || Spacewatch ||  || align=right | 1.8 km || 
|-id=421 bgcolor=#E9E9E9
| 587421 ||  || — || January 7, 2006 || Kitt Peak || Spacewatch ||  || align=right | 1.6 km || 
|-id=422 bgcolor=#E9E9E9
| 587422 ||  || — || January 5, 2006 || Kitt Peak || Spacewatch ||  || align=right | 1.1 km || 
|-id=423 bgcolor=#E9E9E9
| 587423 ||  || — || January 5, 2006 || Kitt Peak || Spacewatch ||  || align=right | 1.2 km || 
|-id=424 bgcolor=#d6d6d6
| 587424 ||  || — || December 7, 2005 || Kitt Peak || Spacewatch ||  || align=right | 2.5 km || 
|-id=425 bgcolor=#d6d6d6
| 587425 ||  || — || January 6, 2006 || Kitt Peak || Spacewatch ||  || align=right | 3.1 km || 
|-id=426 bgcolor=#E9E9E9
| 587426 ||  || — || October 20, 2004 || Catalina || CSS ||  || align=right | 1.1 km || 
|-id=427 bgcolor=#E9E9E9
| 587427 ||  || — || January 6, 2006 || Socorro || LINEAR ||  || align=right data-sort-value="0.69" | 690 m || 
|-id=428 bgcolor=#E9E9E9
| 587428 ||  || — || January 6, 2006 || Anderson Mesa || LONEOS ||  || align=right | 1.2 km || 
|-id=429 bgcolor=#E9E9E9
| 587429 ||  || — || January 8, 2006 || Kitt Peak || Spacewatch ||  || align=right data-sort-value="0.76" | 760 m || 
|-id=430 bgcolor=#E9E9E9
| 587430 ||  || — || September 23, 2008 || Catalina || CSS ||  || align=right | 1.6 km || 
|-id=431 bgcolor=#FA8072
| 587431 ||  || — || November 17, 1995 || Kitt Peak || Spacewatch ||  || align=right data-sort-value="0.57" | 570 m || 
|-id=432 bgcolor=#E9E9E9
| 587432 ||  || — || November 17, 2009 || Mount Lemmon || Mount Lemmon Survey ||  || align=right | 1.4 km || 
|-id=433 bgcolor=#E9E9E9
| 587433 ||  || — || March 17, 2015 || Haleakala || Pan-STARRS ||  || align=right | 1.3 km || 
|-id=434 bgcolor=#fefefe
| 587434 ||  || — || January 7, 2006 || Mount Lemmon || Mount Lemmon Survey ||  || align=right data-sort-value="0.82" | 820 m || 
|-id=435 bgcolor=#E9E9E9
| 587435 ||  || — || September 14, 2013 || Haleakala || Pan-STARRS ||  || align=right | 2.1 km || 
|-id=436 bgcolor=#d6d6d6
| 587436 ||  || — || January 7, 2006 || Mount Lemmon || Mount Lemmon Survey ||  || align=right | 2.0 km || 
|-id=437 bgcolor=#E9E9E9
| 587437 ||  || — || January 4, 2006 || Kitt Peak || Spacewatch ||  || align=right data-sort-value="0.87" | 870 m || 
|-id=438 bgcolor=#d6d6d6
| 587438 ||  || — || January 9, 2006 || Kitt Peak || Spacewatch ||  || align=right | 2.4 km || 
|-id=439 bgcolor=#d6d6d6
| 587439 ||  || — || January 5, 2006 || Kitt Peak || Spacewatch ||  || align=right | 2.7 km || 
|-id=440 bgcolor=#E9E9E9
| 587440 ||  || — || May 12, 2007 || Mount Lemmon || Mount Lemmon Survey ||  || align=right | 1.4 km || 
|-id=441 bgcolor=#E9E9E9
| 587441 ||  || — || January 21, 2006 || Kitt Peak || Spacewatch ||  || align=right | 1.2 km || 
|-id=442 bgcolor=#E9E9E9
| 587442 ||  || — || December 25, 2005 || Mount Lemmon || Mount Lemmon Survey ||  || align=right data-sort-value="0.85" | 850 m || 
|-id=443 bgcolor=#E9E9E9
| 587443 ||  || — || December 22, 2005 || Kitt Peak || Spacewatch ||  || align=right | 1.6 km || 
|-id=444 bgcolor=#E9E9E9
| 587444 ||  || — || January 22, 2006 || Mount Lemmon || Mount Lemmon Survey ||  || align=right | 1.2 km || 
|-id=445 bgcolor=#E9E9E9
| 587445 ||  || — || January 22, 2006 || Mount Lemmon || Mount Lemmon Survey ||  || align=right data-sort-value="0.97" | 970 m || 
|-id=446 bgcolor=#E9E9E9
| 587446 ||  || — || January 22, 2006 || Mount Lemmon || Mount Lemmon Survey ||  || align=right | 1.4 km || 
|-id=447 bgcolor=#E9E9E9
| 587447 ||  || — || January 23, 2006 || Kitt Peak || Spacewatch ||  || align=right | 1.2 km || 
|-id=448 bgcolor=#fefefe
| 587448 ||  || — || April 28, 2003 || Kitt Peak || Spacewatch ||  || align=right data-sort-value="0.56" | 560 m || 
|-id=449 bgcolor=#E9E9E9
| 587449 ||  || — || January 23, 2006 || Kitt Peak || Spacewatch ||  || align=right | 1.6 km || 
|-id=450 bgcolor=#d6d6d6
| 587450 ||  || — || October 15, 2004 || Kitt Peak || Spacewatch ||  || align=right | 2.5 km || 
|-id=451 bgcolor=#E9E9E9
| 587451 ||  || — || January 23, 2006 || Kitt Peak || Spacewatch ||  || align=right | 1.2 km || 
|-id=452 bgcolor=#d6d6d6
| 587452 ||  || — || January 7, 2006 || Kitt Peak || Spacewatch ||  || align=right | 2.2 km || 
|-id=453 bgcolor=#E9E9E9
| 587453 ||  || — || January 25, 2006 || Kitt Peak || Spacewatch ||  || align=right data-sort-value="0.96" | 960 m || 
|-id=454 bgcolor=#E9E9E9
| 587454 ||  || — || January 26, 2006 || Kitt Peak || Spacewatch ||  || align=right | 1.7 km || 
|-id=455 bgcolor=#d6d6d6
| 587455 ||  || — || January 28, 2006 || 7300 || W. K. Y. Yeung ||  || align=right | 3.9 km || 
|-id=456 bgcolor=#E9E9E9
| 587456 ||  || — || January 25, 2006 || Kitt Peak || Spacewatch ||  || align=right | 1.4 km || 
|-id=457 bgcolor=#E9E9E9
| 587457 ||  || — || January 25, 2006 || Kitt Peak || Spacewatch ||  || align=right | 1.1 km || 
|-id=458 bgcolor=#E9E9E9
| 587458 ||  || — || January 27, 2006 || Mount Lemmon || Mount Lemmon Survey ||  || align=right | 1.2 km || 
|-id=459 bgcolor=#E9E9E9
| 587459 ||  || — || January 23, 2006 || Kitt Peak || Spacewatch ||  || align=right data-sort-value="0.75" | 750 m || 
|-id=460 bgcolor=#E9E9E9
| 587460 ||  || — || January 23, 2006 || Mount Lemmon || Mount Lemmon Survey ||  || align=right | 1.5 km || 
|-id=461 bgcolor=#d6d6d6
| 587461 ||  || — || January 28, 2000 || Kitt Peak || Spacewatch ||  || align=right | 2.6 km || 
|-id=462 bgcolor=#E9E9E9
| 587462 ||  || — || January 28, 2006 || Mount Lemmon || Mount Lemmon Survey ||  || align=right | 2.0 km || 
|-id=463 bgcolor=#E9E9E9
| 587463 ||  || — || January 28, 2006 || Kitt Peak || Spacewatch ||  || align=right | 1.5 km || 
|-id=464 bgcolor=#E9E9E9
| 587464 ||  || — || January 23, 2006 || Kitt Peak || Spacewatch ||  || align=right | 1.0 km || 
|-id=465 bgcolor=#E9E9E9
| 587465 ||  || — || January 31, 2006 || Mount Lemmon || Mount Lemmon Survey ||  || align=right data-sort-value="0.80" | 800 m || 
|-id=466 bgcolor=#E9E9E9
| 587466 ||  || — || April 11, 2011 || Mount Lemmon || Mount Lemmon Survey ||  || align=right | 1.1 km || 
|-id=467 bgcolor=#E9E9E9
| 587467 ||  || — || January 31, 2006 || Catalina || CSS ||  || align=right | 2.1 km || 
|-id=468 bgcolor=#E9E9E9
| 587468 ||  || — || January 30, 2006 || Kitt Peak || Spacewatch ||  || align=right | 1.8 km || 
|-id=469 bgcolor=#E9E9E9
| 587469 ||  || — || January 30, 2006 || Kitt Peak || Spacewatch ||  || align=right | 1.5 km || 
|-id=470 bgcolor=#E9E9E9
| 587470 ||  || — || January 31, 2006 || Kitt Peak || Spacewatch ||  || align=right | 1.8 km || 
|-id=471 bgcolor=#E9E9E9
| 587471 ||  || — || October 24, 2005 || Mauna Kea || Mauna Kea Obs. ||  || align=right data-sort-value="0.98" | 980 m || 
|-id=472 bgcolor=#fefefe
| 587472 ||  || — || November 7, 2005 || Mauna Kea || Mauna Kea Obs. ||  || align=right data-sort-value="0.72" | 720 m || 
|-id=473 bgcolor=#d6d6d6
| 587473 ||  || — || January 31, 2006 || Kitt Peak || Spacewatch ||  || align=right | 2.9 km || 
|-id=474 bgcolor=#d6d6d6
| 587474 ||  || — || January 23, 2006 || Kitt Peak || Spacewatch ||  || align=right | 2.2 km || 
|-id=475 bgcolor=#d6d6d6
| 587475 ||  || — || January 26, 2006 || Kitt Peak || Spacewatch ||  || align=right | 2.5 km || 
|-id=476 bgcolor=#fefefe
| 587476 ||  || — || January 27, 2006 || Mount Lemmon || Mount Lemmon Survey ||  || align=right data-sort-value="0.51" | 510 m || 
|-id=477 bgcolor=#E9E9E9
| 587477 ||  || — || November 6, 2013 || Mount Lemmon || Mount Lemmon Survey ||  || align=right | 1.3 km || 
|-id=478 bgcolor=#E9E9E9
| 587478 ||  || — || January 31, 2006 || Kitt Peak || Spacewatch ||  || align=right data-sort-value="0.83" | 830 m || 
|-id=479 bgcolor=#E9E9E9
| 587479 ||  || — || January 7, 2010 || Mount Lemmon || Mount Lemmon Survey ||  || align=right | 1.1 km || 
|-id=480 bgcolor=#E9E9E9
| 587480 ||  || — || April 12, 2011 || Mount Lemmon || Mount Lemmon Survey ||  || align=right | 1.5 km || 
|-id=481 bgcolor=#fefefe
| 587481 ||  || — || January 26, 2006 || Kitt Peak || Spacewatch ||  || align=right data-sort-value="0.54" | 540 m || 
|-id=482 bgcolor=#E9E9E9
| 587482 ||  || — || December 25, 2005 || Mount Lemmon || Mount Lemmon Survey ||  || align=right | 1.2 km || 
|-id=483 bgcolor=#d6d6d6
| 587483 ||  || — || July 25, 2015 || Haleakala || Pan-STARRS ||  || align=right | 3.2 km || 
|-id=484 bgcolor=#E9E9E9
| 587484 ||  || — || January 31, 2006 || Kitt Peak || Spacewatch ||  || align=right | 1.0 km || 
|-id=485 bgcolor=#E9E9E9
| 587485 ||  || — || January 21, 2015 || Haleakala || Pan-STARRS ||  || align=right | 1.0 km || 
|-id=486 bgcolor=#E9E9E9
| 587486 ||  || — || January 25, 2006 || Kitt Peak || Spacewatch ||  || align=right | 1.0 km || 
|-id=487 bgcolor=#fefefe
| 587487 ||  || — || January 25, 2006 || Kitt Peak || Spacewatch ||  || align=right data-sort-value="0.53" | 530 m || 
|-id=488 bgcolor=#d6d6d6
| 587488 ||  || — || January 23, 2006 || Kitt Peak || Spacewatch ||  || align=right | 2.5 km || 
|-id=489 bgcolor=#E9E9E9
| 587489 ||  || — || February 1, 2006 || Mount Lemmon || Mount Lemmon Survey ||  || align=right | 1.1 km || 
|-id=490 bgcolor=#E9E9E9
| 587490 ||  || — || February 1, 2006 || Mount Lemmon || Mount Lemmon Survey ||  || align=right | 1.1 km || 
|-id=491 bgcolor=#d6d6d6
| 587491 ||  || — || January 23, 2006 || Mount Lemmon || Mount Lemmon Survey ||  || align=right | 2.7 km || 
|-id=492 bgcolor=#E9E9E9
| 587492 ||  || — || January 8, 2006 || Mount Lemmon || Mount Lemmon Survey ||  || align=right | 1.7 km || 
|-id=493 bgcolor=#d6d6d6
| 587493 ||  || — || January 9, 2006 || Kitt Peak || Spacewatch ||  || align=right | 2.7 km || 
|-id=494 bgcolor=#E9E9E9
| 587494 ||  || — || January 22, 2006 || Mount Lemmon || Mount Lemmon Survey ||  || align=right | 1.3 km || 
|-id=495 bgcolor=#fefefe
| 587495 ||  || — || February 1, 2006 || Mount Lemmon || Mount Lemmon Survey ||  || align=right data-sort-value="0.59" | 590 m || 
|-id=496 bgcolor=#d6d6d6
| 587496 ||  || — || February 7, 2006 || Kitt Peak || Spacewatch ||  || align=right | 2.4 km || 
|-id=497 bgcolor=#E9E9E9
| 587497 ||  || — || January 10, 2006 || Mount Lemmon || Mount Lemmon Survey ||  || align=right | 1.1 km || 
|-id=498 bgcolor=#d6d6d6
| 587498 ||  || — || November 10, 2004 || Kitt Peak || Spacewatch ||  || align=right | 2.9 km || 
|-id=499 bgcolor=#fefefe
| 587499 ||  || — || January 22, 2006 || Mount Lemmon || Mount Lemmon Survey ||  || align=right data-sort-value="0.40" | 400 m || 
|-id=500 bgcolor=#E9E9E9
| 587500 ||  || — || February 4, 2006 || Kitt Peak || Spacewatch ||  || align=right | 1.2 km || 
|}

587501–587600 

|-bgcolor=#d6d6d6
| 587501 ||  || — || February 5, 2006 || Mount Lemmon || Mount Lemmon Survey ||  || align=right | 2.9 km || 
|-id=502 bgcolor=#E9E9E9
| 587502 ||  || — || November 6, 2013 || Haleakala || Pan-STARRS ||  || align=right | 1.3 km || 
|-id=503 bgcolor=#fefefe
| 587503 ||  || — || February 6, 2006 || Mount Lemmon || Mount Lemmon Survey ||  || align=right data-sort-value="0.80" | 800 m || 
|-id=504 bgcolor=#d6d6d6
| 587504 ||  || — || February 2, 2006 || Kitt Peak || Spacewatch ||  || align=right | 3.2 km || 
|-id=505 bgcolor=#E9E9E9
| 587505 ||  || — || November 6, 2013 || Haleakala || Pan-STARRS ||  || align=right data-sort-value="0.93" | 930 m || 
|-id=506 bgcolor=#d6d6d6
| 587506 ||  || — || January 19, 2012 || Haleakala || Pan-STARRS ||  || align=right | 2.9 km || 
|-id=507 bgcolor=#fefefe
| 587507 ||  || — || August 3, 2014 || Haleakala || Pan-STARRS ||  || align=right data-sort-value="0.50" | 500 m || 
|-id=508 bgcolor=#E9E9E9
| 587508 ||  || — || September 7, 2008 || Mount Lemmon || Mount Lemmon Survey ||  || align=right | 1.3 km || 
|-id=509 bgcolor=#E9E9E9
| 587509 ||  || — || February 18, 2015 || Haleakala || Pan-STARRS ||  || align=right data-sort-value="0.99" | 990 m || 
|-id=510 bgcolor=#E9E9E9
| 587510 ||  || — || August 7, 2008 || Kitt Peak || Spacewatch ||  || align=right | 1.2 km || 
|-id=511 bgcolor=#d6d6d6
| 587511 ||  || — || June 22, 2015 || Haleakala || Pan-STARRS ||  || align=right | 3.4 km || 
|-id=512 bgcolor=#E9E9E9
| 587512 ||  || — || June 12, 2007 || Kitt Peak || Spacewatch ||  || align=right | 1.2 km || 
|-id=513 bgcolor=#E9E9E9
| 587513 ||  || — || February 1, 2006 || Kitt Peak || Spacewatch ||  || align=right | 1.3 km || 
|-id=514 bgcolor=#E9E9E9
| 587514 ||  || — || February 20, 2006 || Kitt Peak || Spacewatch ||  || align=right | 1.6 km || 
|-id=515 bgcolor=#E9E9E9
| 587515 ||  || — || January 23, 2006 || Kitt Peak || Spacewatch ||  || align=right | 1.8 km || 
|-id=516 bgcolor=#E9E9E9
| 587516 ||  || — || February 23, 2006 || Mount Lemmon || Mount Lemmon Survey ||  || align=right | 1.4 km || 
|-id=517 bgcolor=#E9E9E9
| 587517 ||  || — || February 24, 2006 || Palomar || NEAT ||  || align=right | 2.0 km || 
|-id=518 bgcolor=#E9E9E9
| 587518 ||  || — || February 24, 2006 || Kitt Peak || Spacewatch ||  || align=right data-sort-value="0.98" | 980 m || 
|-id=519 bgcolor=#fefefe
| 587519 ||  || — || February 24, 2006 || Mount Lemmon || Mount Lemmon Survey ||  || align=right data-sort-value="0.65" | 650 m || 
|-id=520 bgcolor=#d6d6d6
| 587520 ||  || — || February 23, 2006 || Calvin-Rehoboth || L. A. Molnar ||  || align=right | 2.9 km || 
|-id=521 bgcolor=#E9E9E9
| 587521 ||  || — || December 3, 2005 || Mauna Kea || Mauna Kea Obs. ||  || align=right | 1.3 km || 
|-id=522 bgcolor=#E9E9E9
| 587522 ||  || — || February 24, 2006 || Kitt Peak || Spacewatch ||  || align=right | 1.9 km || 
|-id=523 bgcolor=#E9E9E9
| 587523 ||  || — || February 25, 2006 || Kitt Peak || Spacewatch ||  || align=right | 1.1 km || 
|-id=524 bgcolor=#E9E9E9
| 587524 ||  || — || February 25, 2006 || Kitt Peak || Spacewatch ||  || align=right | 1.1 km || 
|-id=525 bgcolor=#E9E9E9
| 587525 ||  || — || January 30, 2006 || Kitt Peak || Spacewatch ||  || align=right | 1.5 km || 
|-id=526 bgcolor=#C2FFFF
| 587526 ||  || — || February 1, 2006 || Kitt Peak || Spacewatch || L5 || align=right | 9.0 km || 
|-id=527 bgcolor=#E9E9E9
| 587527 ||  || — || February 25, 2006 || Kitt Peak || Spacewatch ||  || align=right | 1.4 km || 
|-id=528 bgcolor=#E9E9E9
| 587528 ||  || — || February 2, 2006 || Mount Lemmon || Mount Lemmon Survey ||  || align=right | 1.3 km || 
|-id=529 bgcolor=#d6d6d6
| 587529 ||  || — || February 25, 2006 || Mount Lemmon || Mount Lemmon Survey ||  || align=right | 2.1 km || 
|-id=530 bgcolor=#fefefe
| 587530 ||  || — || February 25, 2006 || Mount Lemmon || Mount Lemmon Survey ||  || align=right data-sort-value="0.71" | 710 m || 
|-id=531 bgcolor=#E9E9E9
| 587531 ||  || — || January 7, 2006 || Mount Lemmon || Mount Lemmon Survey ||  || align=right | 2.0 km || 
|-id=532 bgcolor=#E9E9E9
| 587532 ||  || — || February 25, 2006 || Kitt Peak || Spacewatch ||  || align=right | 2.0 km || 
|-id=533 bgcolor=#E9E9E9
| 587533 ||  || — || February 25, 2006 || Kitt Peak || Spacewatch ||  || align=right | 1.1 km || 
|-id=534 bgcolor=#fefefe
| 587534 ||  || — || February 27, 2006 || Mount Lemmon || Mount Lemmon Survey ||  || align=right data-sort-value="0.59" | 590 m || 
|-id=535 bgcolor=#fefefe
| 587535 ||  || — || February 27, 2006 || Kitt Peak || Spacewatch ||  || align=right data-sort-value="0.70" | 700 m || 
|-id=536 bgcolor=#E9E9E9
| 587536 ||  || — || February 27, 2006 || Kitt Peak || Spacewatch ||  || align=right | 1.7 km || 
|-id=537 bgcolor=#E9E9E9
| 587537 ||  || — || February 27, 2006 || Kitt Peak || Spacewatch ||  || align=right | 1.6 km || 
|-id=538 bgcolor=#d6d6d6
| 587538 ||  || — || February 27, 2006 || Mount Lemmon || Mount Lemmon Survey ||  || align=right | 2.2 km || 
|-id=539 bgcolor=#E9E9E9
| 587539 ||  || — || February 27, 2006 || Mount Lemmon || Mount Lemmon Survey ||  || align=right | 1.1 km || 
|-id=540 bgcolor=#E9E9E9
| 587540 ||  || — || February 27, 2006 || Kitt Peak || Spacewatch ||  || align=right | 1.7 km || 
|-id=541 bgcolor=#E9E9E9
| 587541 ||  || — || February 27, 2006 || Kitt Peak || Spacewatch ||  || align=right | 1.9 km || 
|-id=542 bgcolor=#fefefe
| 587542 ||  || — || February 24, 2006 || Palomar || NEAT ||  || align=right data-sort-value="0.68" | 680 m || 
|-id=543 bgcolor=#E9E9E9
| 587543 ||  || — || March 13, 2002 || Kitt Peak || Spacewatch ||  || align=right | 1.4 km || 
|-id=544 bgcolor=#E9E9E9
| 587544 ||  || — || February 25, 2006 || Kitt Peak || Spacewatch ||  || align=right | 1.1 km || 
|-id=545 bgcolor=#fefefe
| 587545 ||  || — || February 4, 2006 || Kitt Peak || Spacewatch ||  || align=right data-sort-value="0.48" | 480 m || 
|-id=546 bgcolor=#fefefe
| 587546 ||  || — || February 25, 2006 || Kitt Peak || Spacewatch ||  || align=right data-sort-value="0.49" | 490 m || 
|-id=547 bgcolor=#fefefe
| 587547 ||  || — || February 25, 2006 || Mount Lemmon || Mount Lemmon Survey ||  || align=right data-sort-value="0.59" | 590 m || 
|-id=548 bgcolor=#E9E9E9
| 587548 ||  || — || February 27, 2006 || Kitt Peak || Spacewatch ||  || align=right | 1.2 km || 
|-id=549 bgcolor=#E9E9E9
| 587549 ||  || — || February 25, 2006 || Mount Lemmon || Mount Lemmon Survey ||  || align=right | 1.0 km || 
|-id=550 bgcolor=#d6d6d6
| 587550 ||  || — || February 27, 2006 || Kitt Peak || Spacewatch || 7:4 || align=right | 2.7 km || 
|-id=551 bgcolor=#E9E9E9
| 587551 ||  || — || March 2, 2006 || Kitt Peak || Spacewatch ||  || align=right | 1.8 km || 
|-id=552 bgcolor=#E9E9E9
| 587552 ||  || — || March 2, 2006 || Kitt Peak || Spacewatch ||  || align=right | 1.9 km || 
|-id=553 bgcolor=#fefefe
| 587553 ||  || — || December 3, 2005 || Mauna Kea || Mauna Kea Obs. ||  || align=right data-sort-value="0.79" | 790 m || 
|-id=554 bgcolor=#E9E9E9
| 587554 ||  || — || March 2, 2006 || Kitt Peak || Spacewatch ||  || align=right | 1.1 km || 
|-id=555 bgcolor=#E9E9E9
| 587555 ||  || — || March 2, 2006 || Mount Lemmon || Mount Lemmon Survey ||  || align=right | 1.6 km || 
|-id=556 bgcolor=#fefefe
| 587556 ||  || — || January 31, 2006 || Kitt Peak || Spacewatch ||  || align=right data-sort-value="0.63" | 630 m || 
|-id=557 bgcolor=#fefefe
| 587557 ||  || — || March 3, 2006 || Kitt Peak || Spacewatch ||  || align=right data-sort-value="0.49" | 490 m || 
|-id=558 bgcolor=#E9E9E9
| 587558 ||  || — || March 3, 2006 || Mount Lemmon || Mount Lemmon Survey ||  || align=right | 1.1 km || 
|-id=559 bgcolor=#E9E9E9
| 587559 ||  || — || March 3, 2006 || Kitt Peak || Spacewatch ||  || align=right | 1.0 km || 
|-id=560 bgcolor=#E9E9E9
| 587560 ||  || — || March 3, 2006 || Kitt Peak || Spacewatch ||  || align=right | 1.6 km || 
|-id=561 bgcolor=#E9E9E9
| 587561 ||  || — || February 4, 2006 || Mount Lemmon || Mount Lemmon Survey ||  || align=right | 1.6 km || 
|-id=562 bgcolor=#E9E9E9
| 587562 ||  || — || March 4, 2006 || Kitt Peak || Spacewatch ||  || align=right | 1.8 km || 
|-id=563 bgcolor=#E9E9E9
| 587563 ||  || — || March 4, 2006 || Kitt Peak || Spacewatch ||  || align=right | 1.2 km || 
|-id=564 bgcolor=#E9E9E9
| 587564 ||  || — || March 5, 2006 || Kitt Peak || Spacewatch ||  || align=right | 1.5 km || 
|-id=565 bgcolor=#E9E9E9
| 587565 ||  || — || March 10, 2006 || Lulin || LUSS ||  || align=right | 1.5 km || 
|-id=566 bgcolor=#fefefe
| 587566 ||  || — || July 25, 2014 || Haleakala || Pan-STARRS ||  || align=right data-sort-value="0.45" | 450 m || 
|-id=567 bgcolor=#fefefe
| 587567 ||  || — || July 25, 2014 || Haleakala || Pan-STARRS ||  || align=right data-sort-value="0.56" | 560 m || 
|-id=568 bgcolor=#fefefe
| 587568 ||  || — || March 2, 2006 || Kitt Peak || Spacewatch ||  || align=right data-sort-value="0.48" | 480 m || 
|-id=569 bgcolor=#d6d6d6
| 587569 ||  || — || March 6, 2006 || Calvin-Rehoboth || L. A. Molnar || EUP || align=right | 3.6 km || 
|-id=570 bgcolor=#fefefe
| 587570 ||  || — || March 24, 2006 || Mount Lemmon || Mount Lemmon Survey ||  || align=right data-sort-value="0.70" | 700 m || 
|-id=571 bgcolor=#fefefe
| 587571 ||  || — || March 24, 2006 || Kitt Peak || Spacewatch ||  || align=right data-sort-value="0.56" | 560 m || 
|-id=572 bgcolor=#fefefe
| 587572 ||  || — || March 24, 2006 || Mount Lemmon || Mount Lemmon Survey ||  || align=right data-sort-value="0.55" | 550 m || 
|-id=573 bgcolor=#fefefe
| 587573 ||  || — || March 23, 2006 || Kitt Peak || Spacewatch ||  || align=right data-sort-value="0.67" | 670 m || 
|-id=574 bgcolor=#d6d6d6
| 587574 ||  || — || August 27, 2014 || Haleakala || Pan-STARRS ||  || align=right | 2.6 km || 
|-id=575 bgcolor=#E9E9E9
| 587575 ||  || — || October 20, 2008 || Mount Lemmon || Mount Lemmon Survey ||  || align=right | 1.8 km || 
|-id=576 bgcolor=#d6d6d6
| 587576 ||  || — || March 23, 2006 || Mount Lemmon || Mount Lemmon Survey ||  || align=right | 2.1 km || 
|-id=577 bgcolor=#E9E9E9
| 587577 ||  || — || March 25, 2006 || Kitt Peak || Spacewatch ||  || align=right | 1.5 km || 
|-id=578 bgcolor=#E9E9E9
| 587578 ||  || — || April 1, 2006 || Eskridge || G. Hug ||  || align=right | 1.7 km || 
|-id=579 bgcolor=#fefefe
| 587579 ||  || — || April 4, 2006 || Great Shefford || P. Birtwhistle ||  || align=right data-sort-value="0.70" | 700 m || 
|-id=580 bgcolor=#fefefe
| 587580 ||  || — || March 23, 2006 || Kitt Peak || Spacewatch ||  || align=right data-sort-value="0.55" | 550 m || 
|-id=581 bgcolor=#E9E9E9
| 587581 ||  || — || April 2, 2006 || Mount Lemmon || Mount Lemmon Survey ||  || align=right | 1.3 km || 
|-id=582 bgcolor=#E9E9E9
| 587582 ||  || — || March 2, 2006 || Kitt Peak || Spacewatch ||  || align=right data-sort-value="0.86" | 860 m || 
|-id=583 bgcolor=#fefefe
| 587583 ||  || — || April 7, 2006 || Catalina || CSS ||  || align=right data-sort-value="0.82" | 820 m || 
|-id=584 bgcolor=#E9E9E9
| 587584 ||  || — || September 30, 2017 || Haleakala || Pan-STARRS ||  || align=right | 1.2 km || 
|-id=585 bgcolor=#fefefe
| 587585 ||  || — || April 2, 2006 || Kitt Peak || Spacewatch ||  || align=right data-sort-value="0.55" | 550 m || 
|-id=586 bgcolor=#E9E9E9
| 587586 ||  || — || February 25, 2006 || Kitt Peak || Spacewatch ||  || align=right | 1.8 km || 
|-id=587 bgcolor=#E9E9E9
| 587587 ||  || — || April 9, 2006 || Kitt Peak || Spacewatch ||  || align=right | 1.6 km || 
|-id=588 bgcolor=#fefefe
| 587588 ||  || — || April 20, 2006 || Kitt Peak || Spacewatch ||  || align=right data-sort-value="0.75" | 750 m || 
|-id=589 bgcolor=#FA8072
| 587589 ||  || — || April 20, 2006 || Kitt Peak || Spacewatch ||  || align=right data-sort-value="0.41" | 410 m || 
|-id=590 bgcolor=#E9E9E9
| 587590 ||  || — || April 25, 2006 || Kitt Peak || Spacewatch ||  || align=right | 1.5 km || 
|-id=591 bgcolor=#fefefe
| 587591 ||  || — || April 24, 2006 || Nyukasa || A. Nakanishi ||  || align=right data-sort-value="0.77" | 770 m || 
|-id=592 bgcolor=#fefefe
| 587592 ||  || — || April 7, 2006 || Kitt Peak || Spacewatch ||  || align=right data-sort-value="0.77" | 770 m || 
|-id=593 bgcolor=#E9E9E9
| 587593 ||  || — || April 25, 2006 || Kitt Peak || Spacewatch ||  || align=right | 2.5 km || 
|-id=594 bgcolor=#E9E9E9
| 587594 ||  || — || April 19, 2006 || Kitt Peak || Spacewatch ||  || align=right | 1.6 km || 
|-id=595 bgcolor=#E9E9E9
| 587595 ||  || — || April 29, 2006 || Kitt Peak || Spacewatch ||  || align=right | 2.1 km || 
|-id=596 bgcolor=#fefefe
| 587596 ||  || — || March 26, 2006 || Mount Lemmon || Mount Lemmon Survey ||  || align=right data-sort-value="0.51" | 510 m || 
|-id=597 bgcolor=#fefefe
| 587597 ||  || — || April 30, 2006 || Kitt Peak || Spacewatch ||  || align=right data-sort-value="0.70" | 700 m || 
|-id=598 bgcolor=#fefefe
| 587598 ||  || — || April 30, 2006 || Kitt Peak || Spacewatch ||  || align=right data-sort-value="0.87" | 870 m || 
|-id=599 bgcolor=#fefefe
| 587599 ||  || — || April 30, 2006 || Catalina || CSS ||  || align=right data-sort-value="0.82" | 820 m || 
|-id=600 bgcolor=#E9E9E9
| 587600 ||  || — || April 27, 2006 || Cerro Tololo || Cerro Tololo Obs. ||  || align=right | 1.2 km || 
|}

587601–587700 

|-bgcolor=#E9E9E9
| 587601 ||  || — || April 19, 2006 || Mount Lemmon || Mount Lemmon Survey ||  || align=right | 1.5 km || 
|-id=602 bgcolor=#E9E9E9
| 587602 ||  || — || December 25, 2013 || Mount Lemmon || Mount Lemmon Survey ||  || align=right | 1.6 km || 
|-id=603 bgcolor=#E9E9E9
| 587603 ||  || — || April 8, 2006 || Kitt Peak || Spacewatch ||  || align=right | 1.8 km || 
|-id=604 bgcolor=#fefefe
| 587604 ||  || — || April 26, 2006 || Kitt Peak || Spacewatch ||  || align=right data-sort-value="0.55" | 550 m || 
|-id=605 bgcolor=#E9E9E9
| 587605 ||  || — || May 1, 2006 || Kitt Peak || Spacewatch ||  || align=right | 1.1 km || 
|-id=606 bgcolor=#E9E9E9
| 587606 ||  || — || May 3, 2006 || Kitt Peak || Spacewatch ||  || align=right | 1.7 km || 
|-id=607 bgcolor=#fefefe
| 587607 ||  || — || May 1, 2006 || Kitt Peak || Spacewatch ||  || align=right data-sort-value="0.65" | 650 m || 
|-id=608 bgcolor=#fefefe
| 587608 ||  || — || May 8, 2006 || Kitt Peak || Spacewatch ||  || align=right data-sort-value="0.55" | 550 m || 
|-id=609 bgcolor=#fefefe
| 587609 ||  || — || May 1, 2006 || Kitt Peak || Spacewatch ||  || align=right data-sort-value="0.67" | 670 m || 
|-id=610 bgcolor=#E9E9E9
| 587610 ||  || — || May 1, 2006 || Kitt Peak || Spacewatch ||  || align=right data-sort-value="0.79" | 790 m || 
|-id=611 bgcolor=#fefefe
| 587611 ||  || — || May 5, 2006 || Kitt Peak || Spacewatch ||  || align=right data-sort-value="0.70" | 700 m || 
|-id=612 bgcolor=#fefefe
| 587612 ||  || — || November 30, 2011 || Kitt Peak || Spacewatch ||  || align=right data-sort-value="0.46" | 460 m || 
|-id=613 bgcolor=#E9E9E9
| 587613 ||  || — || April 21, 2014 || Mount Lemmon || Mount Lemmon Survey ||  || align=right data-sort-value="0.67" | 670 m || 
|-id=614 bgcolor=#fefefe
| 587614 ||  || — || May 1, 2006 || Kitt Peak || Spacewatch ||  || align=right data-sort-value="0.67" | 670 m || 
|-id=615 bgcolor=#fefefe
| 587615 ||  || — || January 2, 2009 || Mount Lemmon || Mount Lemmon Survey ||  || align=right data-sort-value="0.74" | 740 m || 
|-id=616 bgcolor=#fefefe
| 587616 ||  || — || April 8, 2006 || Kitt Peak || Spacewatch ||  || align=right data-sort-value="0.65" | 650 m || 
|-id=617 bgcolor=#E9E9E9
| 587617 ||  || — || May 19, 2006 || Mount Lemmon || Mount Lemmon Survey ||  || align=right | 1.00 km || 
|-id=618 bgcolor=#fefefe
| 587618 ||  || — || May 7, 2006 || Mount Lemmon || Mount Lemmon Survey ||  || align=right data-sort-value="0.67" | 670 m || 
|-id=619 bgcolor=#E9E9E9
| 587619 ||  || — || October 21, 2003 || Kitt Peak || Spacewatch ||  || align=right | 2.1 km || 
|-id=620 bgcolor=#fefefe
| 587620 ||  || — || May 5, 2006 || Kitt Peak || Spacewatch ||  || align=right data-sort-value="0.66" | 660 m || 
|-id=621 bgcolor=#fefefe
| 587621 ||  || — || May 20, 2006 || Kitt Peak || Spacewatch ||  || align=right data-sort-value="0.55" | 550 m || 
|-id=622 bgcolor=#fefefe
| 587622 ||  || — || May 20, 2006 || Kitt Peak || Spacewatch ||  || align=right data-sort-value="0.55" | 550 m || 
|-id=623 bgcolor=#E9E9E9
| 587623 ||  || — || May 21, 2006 || Kitt Peak || Spacewatch ||  || align=right | 1.8 km || 
|-id=624 bgcolor=#E9E9E9
| 587624 ||  || — || March 2, 2006 || Kitt Peak || Spacewatch ||  || align=right | 2.1 km || 
|-id=625 bgcolor=#E9E9E9
| 587625 ||  || — || May 22, 2006 || Kitt Peak || Spacewatch ||  || align=right | 2.1 km || 
|-id=626 bgcolor=#E9E9E9
| 587626 ||  || — || May 6, 2006 || Mount Lemmon || Mount Lemmon Survey ||  || align=right | 1.9 km || 
|-id=627 bgcolor=#fefefe
| 587627 ||  || — || May 24, 2006 || Mount Lemmon || Mount Lemmon Survey ||  || align=right data-sort-value="0.70" | 700 m || 
|-id=628 bgcolor=#E9E9E9
| 587628 ||  || — || May 21, 2006 || Siding Spring || SSS ||  || align=right | 2.4 km || 
|-id=629 bgcolor=#fefefe
| 587629 ||  || — || May 22, 2006 || Kitt Peak || Spacewatch ||  || align=right data-sort-value="0.89" | 890 m || 
|-id=630 bgcolor=#fefefe
| 587630 ||  || — || May 25, 2006 || Kitt Peak || Spacewatch ||  || align=right data-sort-value="0.61" | 610 m || 
|-id=631 bgcolor=#E9E9E9
| 587631 ||  || — || May 25, 2006 || Mauna Kea || Mauna Kea Obs. ||  || align=right | 1.7 km || 
|-id=632 bgcolor=#fefefe
| 587632 ||  || — || May 21, 2006 || Kitt Peak || Spacewatch ||  || align=right data-sort-value="0.94" | 940 m || 
|-id=633 bgcolor=#E9E9E9
| 587633 ||  || — || June 5, 2011 || Mount Lemmon || Mount Lemmon Survey ||  || align=right | 1.9 km || 
|-id=634 bgcolor=#E9E9E9
| 587634 ||  || — || October 21, 2012 || Haleakala || Pan-STARRS ||  || align=right | 1.8 km || 
|-id=635 bgcolor=#E9E9E9
| 587635 ||  || — || May 24, 2006 || Kitt Peak || Spacewatch ||  || align=right | 1.4 km || 
|-id=636 bgcolor=#E9E9E9
| 587636 ||  || — || August 3, 2016 || Haleakala || Pan-STARRS ||  || align=right | 1.5 km || 
|-id=637 bgcolor=#fefefe
| 587637 ||  || — || April 13, 2013 || Haleakala || Pan-STARRS ||  || align=right data-sort-value="0.58" | 580 m || 
|-id=638 bgcolor=#E9E9E9
| 587638 ||  || — || October 27, 2017 || Mount Lemmon || Mount Lemmon Survey ||  || align=right | 1.8 km || 
|-id=639 bgcolor=#E9E9E9
| 587639 ||  || — || May 25, 2006 || Mount Lemmon || Mount Lemmon Survey ||  || align=right | 1.7 km || 
|-id=640 bgcolor=#E9E9E9
| 587640 ||  || — || March 16, 2015 || Kitt Peak || Spacewatch ||  || align=right | 1.8 km || 
|-id=641 bgcolor=#E9E9E9
| 587641 ||  || — || June 23, 2006 || Lulin || LUSS ||  || align=right | 2.1 km || 
|-id=642 bgcolor=#fefefe
| 587642 ||  || — || June 21, 2006 || Lulin || LUSS ||  || align=right data-sort-value="0.54" | 540 m || 
|-id=643 bgcolor=#fefefe
| 587643 ||  || — || July 21, 2006 || Mount Lemmon || Mount Lemmon Survey ||  || align=right data-sort-value="0.53" | 530 m || 
|-id=644 bgcolor=#fefefe
| 587644 ||  || — || January 19, 2005 || Kitt Peak || Spacewatch ||  || align=right data-sort-value="0.67" | 670 m || 
|-id=645 bgcolor=#C2FFFF
| 587645 ||  || — || October 22, 2009 || Mount Lemmon || Mount Lemmon Survey || L4 || align=right | 6.3 km || 
|-id=646 bgcolor=#d6d6d6
| 587646 ||  || — || November 8, 2007 || Kitt Peak || Spacewatch ||  || align=right | 1.7 km || 
|-id=647 bgcolor=#E9E9E9
| 587647 ||  || — || August 15, 2006 || Palomar || NEAT || AGN || align=right | 1.3 km || 
|-id=648 bgcolor=#fefefe
| 587648 ||  || — || July 28, 2006 || Siding Spring || SSS ||  || align=right | 1.1 km || 
|-id=649 bgcolor=#fefefe
| 587649 ||  || — || May 26, 2006 || Mount Lemmon || Mount Lemmon Survey ||  || align=right data-sort-value="0.65" | 650 m || 
|-id=650 bgcolor=#fefefe
| 587650 ||  || — || November 2, 2010 || Mount Lemmon || Mount Lemmon Survey ||  || align=right data-sort-value="0.57" | 570 m || 
|-id=651 bgcolor=#d6d6d6
| 587651 ||  || — || August 19, 2006 || Pla D'Arguines || R. Ferrando, M. Ferrando ||  || align=right | 2.1 km || 
|-id=652 bgcolor=#fefefe
| 587652 ||  || — || August 17, 2006 || Palomar || NEAT ||  || align=right data-sort-value="0.85" | 850 m || 
|-id=653 bgcolor=#fefefe
| 587653 ||  || — || August 17, 2006 || Palomar || NEAT ||  || align=right data-sort-value="0.84" | 840 m || 
|-id=654 bgcolor=#fefefe
| 587654 ||  || — || August 17, 2006 || Palomar || NEAT || NYS || align=right data-sort-value="0.68" | 680 m || 
|-id=655 bgcolor=#fefefe
| 587655 ||  || — || August 19, 2006 || Palomar || NEAT ||  || align=right data-sort-value="0.78" | 780 m || 
|-id=656 bgcolor=#fefefe
| 587656 ||  || — || August 21, 2006 || Palomar || NEAT || NYS || align=right data-sort-value="0.69" | 690 m || 
|-id=657 bgcolor=#fefefe
| 587657 ||  || — || May 26, 2006 || Mount Lemmon || Mount Lemmon Survey ||  || align=right data-sort-value="0.68" | 680 m || 
|-id=658 bgcolor=#fefefe
| 587658 ||  || — || August 19, 2006 || Kitt Peak || Spacewatch ||  || align=right data-sort-value="0.74" | 740 m || 
|-id=659 bgcolor=#d6d6d6
| 587659 ||  || — || April 26, 2004 || Mauna Kea || Mauna Kea Obs. ||  || align=right | 1.9 km || 
|-id=660 bgcolor=#fefefe
| 587660 ||  || — || August 20, 2006 || Kitt Peak || Spacewatch || NYS || align=right data-sort-value="0.48" | 480 m || 
|-id=661 bgcolor=#d6d6d6
| 587661 ||  || — || August 23, 2006 || San Marcello || Pistoia Mountains Obs. ||  || align=right | 2.3 km || 
|-id=662 bgcolor=#fefefe
| 587662 ||  || — || August 17, 2006 || Palomar || NEAT ||  || align=right data-sort-value="0.87" | 870 m || 
|-id=663 bgcolor=#fefefe
| 587663 ||  || — || August 17, 2006 || Palomar || NEAT ||  || align=right data-sort-value="0.67" | 670 m || 
|-id=664 bgcolor=#d6d6d6
| 587664 ||  || — || August 28, 2006 || Kitt Peak || Spacewatch ||  || align=right | 2.0 km || 
|-id=665 bgcolor=#fefefe
| 587665 ||  || — || August 24, 2006 || Palomar || NEAT ||  || align=right data-sort-value="0.75" | 750 m || 
|-id=666 bgcolor=#fefefe
| 587666 ||  || — || August 30, 2006 || Anderson Mesa || LONEOS ||  || align=right data-sort-value="0.68" | 680 m || 
|-id=667 bgcolor=#d6d6d6
| 587667 ||  || — || August 19, 2006 || Kitt Peak || Spacewatch ||  || align=right | 2.5 km || 
|-id=668 bgcolor=#d6d6d6
| 587668 ||  || — || August 29, 2006 || Catalina || CSS ||  || align=right | 2.8 km || 
|-id=669 bgcolor=#fefefe
| 587669 ||  || — || August 20, 2006 || Kitt Peak || Spacewatch ||  || align=right data-sort-value="0.69" | 690 m || 
|-id=670 bgcolor=#C2E0FF
| 587670 ||  || — || August 21, 2006 || Cerro Tololo || L. H. Wasserman || cubewano (cold)critical || align=right | 130 km || 
|-id=671 bgcolor=#fefefe
| 587671 ||  || — || October 17, 2010 || Mount Lemmon || Mount Lemmon Survey ||  || align=right data-sort-value="0.85" | 850 m || 
|-id=672 bgcolor=#fefefe
| 587672 ||  || — || August 27, 2006 || Kitt Peak || Spacewatch ||  || align=right data-sort-value="0.61" | 610 m || 
|-id=673 bgcolor=#fefefe
| 587673 ||  || — || October 19, 2010 || Mount Lemmon || Mount Lemmon Survey ||  || align=right data-sort-value="0.67" | 670 m || 
|-id=674 bgcolor=#fefefe
| 587674 ||  || — || August 19, 2006 || Kitt Peak || Spacewatch ||  || align=right data-sort-value="0.56" | 560 m || 
|-id=675 bgcolor=#d6d6d6
| 587675 ||  || — || May 12, 2015 || Mount Lemmon || Mount Lemmon Survey ||  || align=right | 1.9 km || 
|-id=676 bgcolor=#E9E9E9
| 587676 ||  || — || August 19, 2006 || Kitt Peak || Spacewatch ||  || align=right | 1.5 km || 
|-id=677 bgcolor=#d6d6d6
| 587677 ||  || — || August 27, 2006 || Kitt Peak || Spacewatch ||  || align=right | 1.9 km || 
|-id=678 bgcolor=#fefefe
| 587678 ||  || — || August 27, 2006 || Kitt Peak || Spacewatch || MAS || align=right data-sort-value="0.66" | 660 m || 
|-id=679 bgcolor=#fefefe
| 587679 ||  || — || September 14, 2006 || Kitt Peak || Spacewatch ||  || align=right data-sort-value="0.61" | 610 m || 
|-id=680 bgcolor=#d6d6d6
| 587680 ||  || — || September 15, 2006 || Kitt Peak || Spacewatch ||  || align=right | 2.3 km || 
|-id=681 bgcolor=#fefefe
| 587681 ||  || — || September 13, 2006 || Palomar || NEAT ||  || align=right data-sort-value="0.79" | 790 m || 
|-id=682 bgcolor=#d6d6d6
| 587682 ||  || — || September 15, 2006 || Kitt Peak || Spacewatch || KOR || align=right | 1.0 km || 
|-id=683 bgcolor=#fefefe
| 587683 ||  || — || September 19, 2006 || Kitt Peak || Spacewatch ||  || align=right data-sort-value="0.67" | 670 m || 
|-id=684 bgcolor=#d6d6d6
| 587684 ||  || — || October 21, 2006 || Mount Lemmon || Mount Lemmon Survey || EOS || align=right | 1.2 km || 
|-id=685 bgcolor=#fefefe
| 587685 ||  || — || September 14, 2006 || Mauna Kea || J. Masiero, R. Jedicke ||  || align=right data-sort-value="0.66" | 660 m || 
|-id=686 bgcolor=#d6d6d6
| 587686 ||  || — || September 25, 2006 || Mount Lemmon || Mount Lemmon Survey ||  || align=right | 1.9 km || 
|-id=687 bgcolor=#fefefe
| 587687 ||  || — || September 14, 2006 || Mauna Kea || J. Masiero, R. Jedicke ||  || align=right data-sort-value="0.59" | 590 m || 
|-id=688 bgcolor=#d6d6d6
| 587688 ||  || — || September 18, 2006 || Kitt Peak || Spacewatch ||  || align=right | 2.1 km || 
|-id=689 bgcolor=#E9E9E9
| 587689 ||  || — || September 15, 2006 || Kitt Peak || Spacewatch ||  || align=right | 1.5 km || 
|-id=690 bgcolor=#fefefe
| 587690 ||  || — || September 15, 2006 || Kitt Peak || Spacewatch ||  || align=right data-sort-value="0.67" | 670 m || 
|-id=691 bgcolor=#fefefe
| 587691 ||  || — || September 18, 2006 || Catalina || CSS ||  || align=right data-sort-value="0.80" | 800 m || 
|-id=692 bgcolor=#d6d6d6
| 587692 ||  || — || September 17, 2006 || Kitt Peak || Spacewatch ||  || align=right | 1.6 km || 
|-id=693 bgcolor=#fefefe
| 587693 ||  || — || September 19, 2006 || Catalina || CSS ||  || align=right data-sort-value="0.73" | 730 m || 
|-id=694 bgcolor=#fefefe
| 587694 ||  || — || September 16, 2006 || Catalina || CSS ||  || align=right | 1.0 km || 
|-id=695 bgcolor=#d6d6d6
| 587695 ||  || — || September 24, 2006 || Kitt Peak || Spacewatch ||  || align=right | 1.7 km || 
|-id=696 bgcolor=#d6d6d6
| 587696 ||  || — || September 19, 2006 || Kitt Peak || Spacewatch ||  || align=right | 1.9 km || 
|-id=697 bgcolor=#fefefe
| 587697 ||  || — || September 19, 2006 || Kitt Peak || Spacewatch ||  || align=right data-sort-value="0.69" | 690 m || 
|-id=698 bgcolor=#d6d6d6
| 587698 ||  || — || March 15, 2004 || Kitt Peak || Spacewatch ||  || align=right | 1.9 km || 
|-id=699 bgcolor=#d6d6d6
| 587699 ||  || — || September 23, 2006 || Kitt Peak || Spacewatch ||  || align=right | 2.0 km || 
|-id=700 bgcolor=#fefefe
| 587700 ||  || — || August 27, 2006 || Kitt Peak || Spacewatch ||  || align=right data-sort-value="0.67" | 670 m || 
|}

587701–587800 

|-bgcolor=#fefefe
| 587701 ||  || — || September 25, 2006 || Kitt Peak || Spacewatch ||  || align=right data-sort-value="0.61" | 610 m || 
|-id=702 bgcolor=#fefefe
| 587702 ||  || — || September 25, 2006 || Mount Lemmon || Mount Lemmon Survey ||  || align=right data-sort-value="0.43" | 430 m || 
|-id=703 bgcolor=#fefefe
| 587703 ||  || — || September 25, 2006 || Kitt Peak || Spacewatch ||  || align=right data-sort-value="0.65" | 650 m || 
|-id=704 bgcolor=#fefefe
| 587704 ||  || — || September 26, 2006 || Mount Lemmon || Mount Lemmon Survey ||  || align=right data-sort-value="0.69" | 690 m || 
|-id=705 bgcolor=#d6d6d6
| 587705 ||  || — || September 26, 2006 || Mount Lemmon || Mount Lemmon Survey ||  || align=right | 2.0 km || 
|-id=706 bgcolor=#fefefe
| 587706 ||  || — || September 17, 2006 || Kitt Peak || Spacewatch || H || align=right data-sort-value="0.40" | 400 m || 
|-id=707 bgcolor=#fefefe
| 587707 ||  || — || September 25, 2006 || Kitt Peak || Spacewatch ||  || align=right data-sort-value="0.76" | 760 m || 
|-id=708 bgcolor=#d6d6d6
| 587708 ||  || — || September 25, 2006 || Mount Lemmon || Mount Lemmon Survey ||  || align=right | 1.9 km || 
|-id=709 bgcolor=#d6d6d6
| 587709 ||  || — || September 26, 2006 || Mount Lemmon || Mount Lemmon Survey ||  || align=right | 2.6 km || 
|-id=710 bgcolor=#d6d6d6
| 587710 ||  || — || September 19, 2001 || Kitt Peak || Spacewatch || KOR || align=right | 1.2 km || 
|-id=711 bgcolor=#FA8072
| 587711 ||  || — || September 17, 2006 || Kitt Peak || Spacewatch || H || align=right data-sort-value="0.41" | 410 m || 
|-id=712 bgcolor=#d6d6d6
| 587712 ||  || — || September 19, 2006 || Kitt Peak || Spacewatch ||  || align=right | 2.3 km || 
|-id=713 bgcolor=#d6d6d6
| 587713 ||  || — || December 4, 2002 || Kitt Peak || Kitt Peak Obs. || KOR || align=right | 1.5 km || 
|-id=714 bgcolor=#d6d6d6
| 587714 ||  || — || March 24, 2001 || Kitt Peak || M. W. Buie, S. D. Kern || 3:2 || align=right | 2.8 km || 
|-id=715 bgcolor=#E9E9E9
| 587715 ||  || — || September 26, 2006 || Kitt Peak || Spacewatch ||  || align=right data-sort-value="0.49" | 490 m || 
|-id=716 bgcolor=#d6d6d6
| 587716 ||  || — || September 17, 2006 || Kitt Peak || Spacewatch ||  || align=right | 2.2 km || 
|-id=717 bgcolor=#d6d6d6
| 587717 ||  || — || November 19, 2001 || Anderson Mesa || LONEOS ||  || align=right | 2.6 km || 
|-id=718 bgcolor=#d6d6d6
| 587718 ||  || — || September 27, 2006 || Mount Lemmon || Mount Lemmon Survey ||  || align=right | 2.1 km || 
|-id=719 bgcolor=#fefefe
| 587719 ||  || — || September 27, 2006 || Kitt Peak || Spacewatch ||  || align=right data-sort-value="0.90" | 900 m || 
|-id=720 bgcolor=#d6d6d6
| 587720 ||  || — || March 26, 2004 || Kitt Peak || Spacewatch ||  || align=right | 2.0 km || 
|-id=721 bgcolor=#fefefe
| 587721 ||  || — || March 17, 2005 || Kitt Peak || Spacewatch ||  || align=right data-sort-value="0.73" | 730 m || 
|-id=722 bgcolor=#d6d6d6
| 587722 ||  || — || September 26, 2006 || Mount Lemmon || Mount Lemmon Survey ||  || align=right | 1.8 km || 
|-id=723 bgcolor=#fefefe
| 587723 ||  || — || September 27, 2006 || Kitt Peak || Spacewatch ||  || align=right data-sort-value="0.56" | 560 m || 
|-id=724 bgcolor=#d6d6d6
| 587724 ||  || — || September 17, 2006 || Kitt Peak || Spacewatch ||  || align=right | 1.6 km || 
|-id=725 bgcolor=#fefefe
| 587725 ||  || — || September 17, 2006 || Kitt Peak || Spacewatch ||  || align=right data-sort-value="0.62" | 620 m || 
|-id=726 bgcolor=#d6d6d6
| 587726 ||  || — || September 27, 2006 || Kitt Peak || Spacewatch ||  || align=right | 2.6 km || 
|-id=727 bgcolor=#d6d6d6
| 587727 ||  || — || September 27, 2006 || Kitt Peak || Spacewatch || 3:2 || align=right | 3.0 km || 
|-id=728 bgcolor=#d6d6d6
| 587728 ||  || — || September 27, 2006 || Kitt Peak || Spacewatch ||  || align=right | 2.2 km || 
|-id=729 bgcolor=#d6d6d6
| 587729 ||  || — || September 28, 2006 || Kitt Peak || Spacewatch ||  || align=right | 1.5 km || 
|-id=730 bgcolor=#d6d6d6
| 587730 ||  || — || September 30, 2006 || Mount Lemmon || Mount Lemmon Survey ||  || align=right | 2.0 km || 
|-id=731 bgcolor=#fefefe
| 587731 ||  || — || May 7, 2005 || Mount Lemmon || Mount Lemmon Survey ||  || align=right data-sort-value="0.80" | 800 m || 
|-id=732 bgcolor=#fefefe
| 587732 ||  || — || September 30, 2006 || Catalina || CSS ||  || align=right data-sort-value="0.80" | 800 m || 
|-id=733 bgcolor=#fefefe
| 587733 ||  || — || September 18, 2006 || Kitt Peak || Spacewatch ||  || align=right data-sort-value="0.66" | 660 m || 
|-id=734 bgcolor=#d6d6d6
| 587734 ||  || — || August 28, 2006 || Apache Point || SDSS Collaboration ||  || align=right | 2.7 km || 
|-id=735 bgcolor=#fefefe
| 587735 ||  || — || November 16, 2006 || Catalina || CSS ||  || align=right data-sort-value="0.96" | 960 m || 
|-id=736 bgcolor=#d6d6d6
| 587736 ||  || — || September 11, 2006 || Apache Point || SDSS Collaboration ||  || align=right | 2.1 km || 
|-id=737 bgcolor=#d6d6d6
| 587737 ||  || — || October 16, 2006 || Mount Lemmon || Mount Lemmon Survey ||  || align=right | 2.2 km || 
|-id=738 bgcolor=#fefefe
| 587738 ||  || — || August 18, 2006 || Kitt Peak || Spacewatch ||  || align=right data-sort-value="0.60" | 600 m || 
|-id=739 bgcolor=#fefefe
| 587739 ||  || — || April 18, 2012 || Mount Lemmon || Mount Lemmon Survey ||  || align=right data-sort-value="0.63" | 630 m || 
|-id=740 bgcolor=#d6d6d6
| 587740 ||  || — || September 16, 2006 || Kitt Peak || Spacewatch ||  || align=right | 1.8 km || 
|-id=741 bgcolor=#fefefe
| 587741 ||  || — || September 28, 2006 || Kitt Peak || Spacewatch ||  || align=right data-sort-value="0.75" | 750 m || 
|-id=742 bgcolor=#fefefe
| 587742 ||  || — || November 12, 2010 || La Sagra || OAM Obs. ||  || align=right | 1.1 km || 
|-id=743 bgcolor=#d6d6d6
| 587743 ||  || — || September 28, 2006 || Kitt Peak || Spacewatch ||  || align=right | 2.6 km || 
|-id=744 bgcolor=#fefefe
| 587744 ||  || — || September 18, 2006 || Kitt Peak || Spacewatch ||  || align=right data-sort-value="0.56" | 560 m || 
|-id=745 bgcolor=#E9E9E9
| 587745 ||  || — || March 8, 2013 || Haleakala || Pan-STARRS ||  || align=right | 1.4 km || 
|-id=746 bgcolor=#d6d6d6
| 587746 ||  || — || March 26, 2009 || Mount Lemmon || Mount Lemmon Survey ||  || align=right | 2.1 km || 
|-id=747 bgcolor=#fefefe
| 587747 ||  || — || September 17, 2006 || Kitt Peak || Spacewatch ||  || align=right data-sort-value="0.67" | 670 m || 
|-id=748 bgcolor=#d6d6d6
| 587748 ||  || — || September 24, 2006 || Kitt Peak || Spacewatch ||  || align=right | 2.1 km || 
|-id=749 bgcolor=#d6d6d6
| 587749 ||  || — || September 30, 2006 || Mount Lemmon || Mount Lemmon Survey ||  || align=right | 1.7 km || 
|-id=750 bgcolor=#fefefe
| 587750 ||  || — || October 2, 2006 || Mount Lemmon || Mount Lemmon Survey ||  || align=right data-sort-value="0.58" | 580 m || 
|-id=751 bgcolor=#fefefe
| 587751 ||  || — || March 10, 2005 || Mount Lemmon || Mount Lemmon Survey ||  || align=right data-sort-value="0.73" | 730 m || 
|-id=752 bgcolor=#d6d6d6
| 587752 ||  || — || October 12, 2006 || Palomar || NEAT ||  || align=right | 2.8 km || 
|-id=753 bgcolor=#fefefe
| 587753 ||  || — || October 4, 2006 || Mount Lemmon || Mount Lemmon Survey ||  || align=right data-sort-value="0.79" | 790 m || 
|-id=754 bgcolor=#fefefe
| 587754 ||  || — || October 15, 2006 || Catalina || CSS ||  || align=right data-sort-value="0.79" | 790 m || 
|-id=755 bgcolor=#d6d6d6
| 587755 ||  || — || October 13, 2006 || Kitt Peak || Spacewatch ||  || align=right | 1.8 km || 
|-id=756 bgcolor=#d6d6d6
| 587756 ||  || — || September 16, 2006 || Apache Point || SDSS Collaboration ||  || align=right | 2.4 km || 
|-id=757 bgcolor=#d6d6d6
| 587757 ||  || — || October 3, 2006 || Apache Point || SDSS Collaboration ||  || align=right | 1.8 km || 
|-id=758 bgcolor=#d6d6d6
| 587758 ||  || — || October 11, 2006 || Apache Point || SDSS Collaboration ||  || align=right | 2.1 km || 
|-id=759 bgcolor=#d6d6d6
| 587759 ||  || — || March 2, 2009 || Mount Lemmon || Mount Lemmon Survey ||  || align=right | 2.8 km || 
|-id=760 bgcolor=#d6d6d6
| 587760 ||  || — || October 2, 2006 || Mount Lemmon || Mount Lemmon Survey ||  || align=right | 1.9 km || 
|-id=761 bgcolor=#d6d6d6
| 587761 ||  || — || April 4, 2014 || Mount Lemmon || Mount Lemmon Survey ||  || align=right | 2.0 km || 
|-id=762 bgcolor=#E9E9E9
| 587762 ||  || — || October 3, 2006 || Mount Lemmon || Mount Lemmon Survey ||  || align=right | 1.5 km || 
|-id=763 bgcolor=#fefefe
| 587763 ||  || — || October 13, 2006 || Kitt Peak || Spacewatch ||  || align=right data-sort-value="0.74" | 740 m || 
|-id=764 bgcolor=#fefefe
| 587764 ||  || — || October 3, 2006 || Mount Lemmon || Mount Lemmon Survey ||  || align=right data-sort-value="0.65" | 650 m || 
|-id=765 bgcolor=#d6d6d6
| 587765 ||  || — || October 3, 2006 || Mount Lemmon || Mount Lemmon Survey ||  || align=right | 2.2 km || 
|-id=766 bgcolor=#d6d6d6
| 587766 ||  || — || October 2, 2006 || Mount Lemmon || Mount Lemmon Survey ||  || align=right | 2.3 km || 
|-id=767 bgcolor=#d6d6d6
| 587767 ||  || — || October 2, 2006 || Mount Lemmon || Mount Lemmon Survey ||  || align=right | 2.4 km || 
|-id=768 bgcolor=#d6d6d6
| 587768 ||  || — || September 26, 2006 || Mount Lemmon || Mount Lemmon Survey || 3:2 || align=right | 4.3 km || 
|-id=769 bgcolor=#d6d6d6
| 587769 ||  || — || October 17, 2006 || Mount Lemmon || Mount Lemmon Survey ||  || align=right | 2.3 km || 
|-id=770 bgcolor=#d6d6d6
| 587770 ||  || — || October 16, 2006 || Kitt Peak || Spacewatch ||  || align=right | 2.7 km || 
|-id=771 bgcolor=#d6d6d6
| 587771 ||  || — || October 16, 2006 || Kitt Peak || Spacewatch ||  || align=right | 2.4 km || 
|-id=772 bgcolor=#fefefe
| 587772 ||  || — || January 15, 2004 || Kitt Peak || Spacewatch ||  || align=right data-sort-value="0.92" | 920 m || 
|-id=773 bgcolor=#d6d6d6
| 587773 ||  || — || July 27, 2005 || Palomar || NEAT || 3:2 || align=right | 4.2 km || 
|-id=774 bgcolor=#fefefe
| 587774 ||  || — || October 19, 2006 || Kitt Peak || Spacewatch ||  || align=right data-sort-value="0.91" | 910 m || 
|-id=775 bgcolor=#E9E9E9
| 587775 ||  || — || September 28, 2006 || Kitt Peak || Spacewatch ||  || align=right data-sort-value="0.93" | 930 m || 
|-id=776 bgcolor=#fefefe
| 587776 ||  || — || October 19, 2006 || Kitt Peak || Spacewatch ||  || align=right data-sort-value="0.75" | 750 m || 
|-id=777 bgcolor=#d6d6d6
| 587777 ||  || — || October 19, 2006 || Kitt Peak || Spacewatch ||  || align=right | 1.8 km || 
|-id=778 bgcolor=#fefefe
| 587778 ||  || — || October 2, 2006 || Mount Lemmon || Mount Lemmon Survey ||  || align=right data-sort-value="0.56" | 560 m || 
|-id=779 bgcolor=#fefefe
| 587779 ||  || — || August 27, 2006 || Kitt Peak || Spacewatch || H || align=right data-sort-value="0.43" | 430 m || 
|-id=780 bgcolor=#d6d6d6
| 587780 ||  || — || October 20, 2006 || Kitt Peak || Spacewatch ||  || align=right | 2.3 km || 
|-id=781 bgcolor=#d6d6d6
| 587781 ||  || — || September 26, 2006 || Kitt Peak || Spacewatch ||  || align=right | 2.7 km || 
|-id=782 bgcolor=#d6d6d6
| 587782 ||  || — || October 21, 2006 || Mount Lemmon || Mount Lemmon Survey ||  || align=right | 2.0 km || 
|-id=783 bgcolor=#d6d6d6
| 587783 ||  || — || September 27, 2006 || Kitt Peak || Spacewatch ||  || align=right | 1.8 km || 
|-id=784 bgcolor=#d6d6d6
| 587784 ||  || — || October 23, 2006 || Palomar || NEAT ||  || align=right | 3.4 km || 
|-id=785 bgcolor=#fefefe
| 587785 ||  || — || October 2, 2006 || Mount Lemmon || Mount Lemmon Survey ||  || align=right data-sort-value="0.71" | 710 m || 
|-id=786 bgcolor=#d6d6d6
| 587786 ||  || — || September 25, 2006 || Kitt Peak || Spacewatch ||  || align=right | 2.0 km || 
|-id=787 bgcolor=#d6d6d6
| 587787 ||  || — || October 27, 2006 || Kitt Peak || Spacewatch ||  || align=right | 2.8 km || 
|-id=788 bgcolor=#d6d6d6
| 587788 ||  || — || October 19, 2006 || Kitt Peak || Spacewatch ||  || align=right | 1.8 km || 
|-id=789 bgcolor=#E9E9E9
| 587789 ||  || — || October 28, 2006 || Kitt Peak || Spacewatch ||  || align=right | 1.3 km || 
|-id=790 bgcolor=#d6d6d6
| 587790 ||  || — || November 12, 2006 || Mount Lemmon || Mount Lemmon Survey ||  || align=right | 2.3 km || 
|-id=791 bgcolor=#d6d6d6
| 587791 ||  || — || October 16, 2006 || Mount Lemmon || Mount Lemmon Survey ||  || align=right | 1.9 km || 
|-id=792 bgcolor=#d6d6d6
| 587792 ||  || — || October 26, 2006 || Mauna Kea || Mauna Kea Obs. ||  || align=right | 1.9 km || 
|-id=793 bgcolor=#d6d6d6
| 587793 ||  || — || October 26, 2006 || Mauna Kea || Mauna Kea Obs. ||  || align=right | 2.1 km || 
|-id=794 bgcolor=#fefefe
| 587794 ||  || — || October 21, 2006 || Kitt Peak || Spacewatch ||  || align=right data-sort-value="0.49" | 490 m || 
|-id=795 bgcolor=#fefefe
| 587795 ||  || — || October 21, 2006 || Kitt Peak || Spacewatch ||  || align=right data-sort-value="0.83" | 830 m || 
|-id=796 bgcolor=#E9E9E9
| 587796 ||  || — || October 1, 2006 || Kitt Peak || Spacewatch ||  || align=right | 1.2 km || 
|-id=797 bgcolor=#d6d6d6
| 587797 ||  || — || May 7, 2014 || Haleakala || Pan-STARRS ||  || align=right | 2.3 km || 
|-id=798 bgcolor=#fefefe
| 587798 ||  || — || October 16, 2006 || Kitt Peak || Spacewatch ||  || align=right data-sort-value="0.69" | 690 m || 
|-id=799 bgcolor=#d6d6d6
| 587799 ||  || — || September 4, 2011 || Haleakala || Pan-STARRS ||  || align=right | 1.7 km || 
|-id=800 bgcolor=#d6d6d6
| 587800 ||  || — || October 2, 2006 || Mount Lemmon || Mount Lemmon Survey ||  || align=right | 2.3 km || 
|}

587801–587900 

|-bgcolor=#d6d6d6
| 587801 ||  || — || October 22, 2006 || Kitt Peak || Spacewatch ||  || align=right | 1.8 km || 
|-id=802 bgcolor=#d6d6d6
| 587802 ||  || — || October 16, 2006 || Kitt Peak || Spacewatch ||  || align=right | 1.6 km || 
|-id=803 bgcolor=#d6d6d6
| 587803 ||  || — || October 22, 2006 || Kitt Peak || Spacewatch ||  || align=right | 2.0 km || 
|-id=804 bgcolor=#fefefe
| 587804 ||  || — || November 10, 2006 || Kitt Peak || Spacewatch ||  || align=right data-sort-value="0.60" | 600 m || 
|-id=805 bgcolor=#d6d6d6
| 587805 ||  || — || November 15, 2006 || Vail-Jarnac || Jarnac Obs. ||  || align=right | 2.3 km || 
|-id=806 bgcolor=#d6d6d6
| 587806 ||  || — || November 11, 2006 || Kitt Peak || Spacewatch ||  || align=right | 2.9 km || 
|-id=807 bgcolor=#d6d6d6
| 587807 ||  || — || November 11, 2006 || Kitt Peak || Spacewatch ||  || align=right | 2.3 km || 
|-id=808 bgcolor=#d6d6d6
| 587808 ||  || — || November 11, 2006 || Mount Lemmon || Mount Lemmon Survey ||  || align=right | 2.5 km || 
|-id=809 bgcolor=#fefefe
| 587809 ||  || — || November 15, 2006 || Mount Lemmon || Mount Lemmon Survey ||  || align=right data-sort-value="0.77" | 770 m || 
|-id=810 bgcolor=#d6d6d6
| 587810 ||  || — || November 14, 2006 || Kitt Peak || Spacewatch ||  || align=right | 1.9 km || 
|-id=811 bgcolor=#E9E9E9
| 587811 ||  || — || September 28, 2006 || Mount Lemmon || Mount Lemmon Survey ||  || align=right | 2.0 km || 
|-id=812 bgcolor=#E9E9E9
| 587812 ||  || — || November 15, 2006 || Kitt Peak || Spacewatch ||  || align=right data-sort-value="0.64" | 640 m || 
|-id=813 bgcolor=#d6d6d6
| 587813 ||  || — || November 15, 2006 || Kitt Peak || Spacewatch ||  || align=right | 2.1 km || 
|-id=814 bgcolor=#fefefe
| 587814 ||  || — || October 11, 2006 || Kitt Peak || Spacewatch ||  || align=right data-sort-value="0.60" | 600 m || 
|-id=815 bgcolor=#d6d6d6
| 587815 ||  || — || November 1, 2006 || Mount Lemmon || Mount Lemmon Survey ||  || align=right | 2.3 km || 
|-id=816 bgcolor=#d6d6d6
| 587816 ||  || — || September 21, 2000 || Kitt Peak || R. Millis, R. M. Wagner ||  || align=right | 1.7 km || 
|-id=817 bgcolor=#fefefe
| 587817 ||  || — || November 20, 2006 || Kitt Peak || Spacewatch ||  || align=right | 1.6 km || 
|-id=818 bgcolor=#fefefe
| 587818 ||  || — || October 3, 2006 || Mount Lemmon || Mount Lemmon Survey ||  || align=right data-sort-value="0.71" | 710 m || 
|-id=819 bgcolor=#d6d6d6
| 587819 ||  || — || November 16, 2006 || Mount Lemmon || Mount Lemmon Survey ||  || align=right | 2.5 km || 
|-id=820 bgcolor=#fefefe
| 587820 ||  || — || November 16, 2006 || Kitt Peak || Spacewatch ||  || align=right data-sort-value="0.77" | 770 m || 
|-id=821 bgcolor=#d6d6d6
| 587821 ||  || — || November 16, 2006 || Kitt Peak || Spacewatch ||  || align=right | 3.0 km || 
|-id=822 bgcolor=#d6d6d6
| 587822 ||  || — || November 16, 2006 || Kitt Peak || Spacewatch ||  || align=right | 2.8 km || 
|-id=823 bgcolor=#d6d6d6
| 587823 ||  || — || August 5, 2005 || Palomar || NEAT ||  || align=right | 2.8 km || 
|-id=824 bgcolor=#d6d6d6
| 587824 ||  || — || November 17, 2006 || Mount Lemmon || Mount Lemmon Survey ||  || align=right | 2.7 km || 
|-id=825 bgcolor=#d6d6d6
| 587825 ||  || — || November 17, 2006 || Mount Lemmon || Mount Lemmon Survey ||  || align=right | 2.1 km || 
|-id=826 bgcolor=#d6d6d6
| 587826 ||  || — || November 18, 2006 || Kitt Peak || Spacewatch || 3:2 || align=right | 3.8 km || 
|-id=827 bgcolor=#E9E9E9
| 587827 ||  || — || November 18, 2006 || Kitt Peak || Spacewatch ||  || align=right | 2.0 km || 
|-id=828 bgcolor=#fefefe
| 587828 ||  || — || November 18, 2006 || Kitt Peak || Spacewatch ||  || align=right data-sort-value="0.81" | 810 m || 
|-id=829 bgcolor=#d6d6d6
| 587829 ||  || — || November 18, 2006 || Kitt Peak || Spacewatch ||  || align=right | 2.6 km || 
|-id=830 bgcolor=#d6d6d6
| 587830 ||  || — || November 18, 2006 || Kitt Peak || Spacewatch ||  || align=right | 2.0 km || 
|-id=831 bgcolor=#d6d6d6
| 587831 ||  || — || November 18, 2006 || Kitt Peak || Spacewatch ||  || align=right | 3.9 km || 
|-id=832 bgcolor=#d6d6d6
| 587832 ||  || — || November 19, 2006 || Kitt Peak || Spacewatch ||  || align=right | 2.3 km || 
|-id=833 bgcolor=#d6d6d6
| 587833 ||  || — || November 19, 2006 || Kitt Peak || Spacewatch ||  || align=right | 3.1 km || 
|-id=834 bgcolor=#fefefe
| 587834 ||  || — || November 19, 2006 || Kitt Peak || Spacewatch ||  || align=right data-sort-value="0.76" | 760 m || 
|-id=835 bgcolor=#d6d6d6
| 587835 ||  || — || November 20, 2006 || Kitt Peak || Spacewatch ||  || align=right | 3.4 km || 
|-id=836 bgcolor=#fefefe
| 587836 ||  || — || November 20, 2006 || Kitt Peak || Spacewatch ||  || align=right data-sort-value="0.66" | 660 m || 
|-id=837 bgcolor=#E9E9E9
| 587837 ||  || — || November 18, 2006 || Kitt Peak || Spacewatch ||  || align=right data-sort-value="0.78" | 780 m || 
|-id=838 bgcolor=#fefefe
| 587838 ||  || — || November 18, 2006 || Mount Lemmon || Mount Lemmon Survey ||  || align=right data-sort-value="0.66" | 660 m || 
|-id=839 bgcolor=#fefefe
| 587839 ||  || — || November 20, 2006 || Kitt Peak || Spacewatch ||  || align=right data-sort-value="0.71" | 710 m || 
|-id=840 bgcolor=#d6d6d6
| 587840 ||  || — || October 31, 2006 || Mount Lemmon || Mount Lemmon Survey ||  || align=right | 2.5 km || 
|-id=841 bgcolor=#d6d6d6
| 587841 ||  || — || November 5, 2005 || Kitt Peak || Spacewatch ||  || align=right | 3.0 km || 
|-id=842 bgcolor=#fefefe
| 587842 ||  || — || November 23, 2006 || Kitt Peak || Spacewatch ||  || align=right data-sort-value="0.64" | 640 m || 
|-id=843 bgcolor=#d6d6d6
| 587843 ||  || — || November 24, 2006 || Mount Lemmon || Mount Lemmon Survey ||  || align=right | 2.0 km || 
|-id=844 bgcolor=#E9E9E9
| 587844 ||  || — || November 24, 2006 || Kitt Peak || Spacewatch ||  || align=right data-sort-value="0.80" | 800 m || 
|-id=845 bgcolor=#d6d6d6
| 587845 ||  || — || November 25, 2006 || Mount Lemmon || Mount Lemmon Survey ||  || align=right | 2.7 km || 
|-id=846 bgcolor=#fefefe
| 587846 ||  || — || November 11, 2006 || Kitt Peak || Spacewatch ||  || align=right data-sort-value="0.87" | 870 m || 
|-id=847 bgcolor=#d6d6d6
| 587847 ||  || — || November 22, 2006 || Mount Lemmon || Mount Lemmon Survey || 3:2 || align=right | 4.0 km || 
|-id=848 bgcolor=#d6d6d6
| 587848 ||  || — || November 23, 2006 || Mount Lemmon || Mount Lemmon Survey ||  || align=right | 2.8 km || 
|-id=849 bgcolor=#d6d6d6
| 587849 ||  || — || September 24, 2011 || Haleakala || Pan-STARRS ||  || align=right | 2.7 km || 
|-id=850 bgcolor=#d6d6d6
| 587850 ||  || — || January 20, 2013 || Kitt Peak || Spacewatch ||  || align=right | 2.0 km || 
|-id=851 bgcolor=#d6d6d6
| 587851 ||  || — || October 23, 2011 || Kitt Peak || Spacewatch ||  || align=right | 2.0 km || 
|-id=852 bgcolor=#E9E9E9
| 587852 ||  || — || October 8, 2015 || Haleakala || Pan-STARRS ||  || align=right | 1.2 km || 
|-id=853 bgcolor=#fefefe
| 587853 ||  || — || November 6, 2010 || Mount Lemmon || Mount Lemmon Survey ||  || align=right data-sort-value="0.74" | 740 m || 
|-id=854 bgcolor=#d6d6d6
| 587854 ||  || — || February 12, 2008 || Mount Lemmon || Mount Lemmon Survey ||  || align=right | 2.3 km || 
|-id=855 bgcolor=#d6d6d6
| 587855 ||  || — || November 24, 2006 || Mount Lemmon || Mount Lemmon Survey ||  || align=right | 2.0 km || 
|-id=856 bgcolor=#d6d6d6
| 587856 ||  || — || October 23, 2011 || Mount Lemmon || Mount Lemmon Survey ||  || align=right | 2.6 km || 
|-id=857 bgcolor=#d6d6d6
| 587857 ||  || — || November 22, 2006 || Kitt Peak || Spacewatch ||  || align=right | 2.7 km || 
|-id=858 bgcolor=#d6d6d6
| 587858 ||  || — || November 18, 2006 || Kitt Peak || Spacewatch ||  || align=right | 2.5 km || 
|-id=859 bgcolor=#d6d6d6
| 587859 ||  || — || July 11, 2015 || Haleakala || Pan-STARRS ||  || align=right | 2.5 km || 
|-id=860 bgcolor=#d6d6d6
| 587860 ||  || — || September 14, 2013 || Haleakala || Pan-STARRS || 3:2 || align=right | 3.7 km || 
|-id=861 bgcolor=#E9E9E9
| 587861 ||  || — || November 24, 2006 || Mount Lemmon || Mount Lemmon Survey ||  || align=right data-sort-value="0.80" | 800 m || 
|-id=862 bgcolor=#E9E9E9
| 587862 ||  || — || February 8, 2008 || Kitt Peak || Spacewatch ||  || align=right | 1.8 km || 
|-id=863 bgcolor=#d6d6d6
| 587863 ||  || — || September 28, 2011 || Mount Lemmon || Mount Lemmon Survey ||  || align=right | 2.3 km || 
|-id=864 bgcolor=#d6d6d6
| 587864 ||  || — || October 30, 2017 || Haleakala || Pan-STARRS ||  || align=right | 2.0 km || 
|-id=865 bgcolor=#fefefe
| 587865 ||  || — || November 16, 2006 || Kitt Peak || Spacewatch ||  || align=right data-sort-value="0.49" | 490 m || 
|-id=866 bgcolor=#d6d6d6
| 587866 ||  || — || November 18, 2006 || Kitt Peak || Spacewatch ||  || align=right | 2.4 km || 
|-id=867 bgcolor=#E9E9E9
| 587867 ||  || — || December 10, 2006 || Kitt Peak || Spacewatch ||  || align=right | 2.0 km || 
|-id=868 bgcolor=#d6d6d6
| 587868 ||  || — || October 23, 2006 || Kitt Peak || Spacewatch ||  || align=right | 2.1 km || 
|-id=869 bgcolor=#E9E9E9
| 587869 ||  || — || December 13, 2006 || Mount Lemmon || Mount Lemmon Survey ||  || align=right | 1.6 km || 
|-id=870 bgcolor=#E9E9E9
| 587870 ||  || — || December 12, 2006 || Marly || P. Kocher ||  || align=right | 1.0 km || 
|-id=871 bgcolor=#fefefe
| 587871 ||  || — || December 12, 2006 || Kitt Peak || Spacewatch ||  || align=right data-sort-value="0.67" | 670 m || 
|-id=872 bgcolor=#fefefe
| 587872 ||  || — || December 13, 2006 || Socorro || LINEAR ||  || align=right data-sort-value="0.74" | 740 m || 
|-id=873 bgcolor=#d6d6d6
| 587873 ||  || — || November 3, 2011 || Kitt Peak || Spacewatch ||  || align=right | 2.4 km || 
|-id=874 bgcolor=#d6d6d6
| 587874 ||  || — || July 25, 2015 || Haleakala || Pan-STARRS ||  || align=right | 2.5 km || 
|-id=875 bgcolor=#d6d6d6
| 587875 ||  || — || November 24, 2011 || Haleakala || Pan-STARRS ||  || align=right | 2.2 km || 
|-id=876 bgcolor=#d6d6d6
| 587876 ||  || — || January 10, 2013 || Haleakala || Pan-STARRS ||  || align=right | 2.0 km || 
|-id=877 bgcolor=#fefefe
| 587877 ||  || — || December 13, 2006 || Mount Lemmon || Mount Lemmon Survey ||  || align=right data-sort-value="0.81" | 810 m || 
|-id=878 bgcolor=#d6d6d6
| 587878 ||  || — || December 13, 2006 || Kitt Peak || Spacewatch ||  || align=right | 2.4 km || 
|-id=879 bgcolor=#d6d6d6
| 587879 ||  || — || December 13, 2006 || Kitt Peak || Spacewatch ||  || align=right | 1.9 km || 
|-id=880 bgcolor=#d6d6d6
| 587880 ||  || — || November 16, 2006 || Mount Lemmon || Mount Lemmon Survey ||  || align=right | 2.1 km || 
|-id=881 bgcolor=#d6d6d6
| 587881 ||  || — || December 21, 2006 || Kitt Peak || Spacewatch ||  || align=right | 2.9 km || 
|-id=882 bgcolor=#d6d6d6
| 587882 ||  || — || October 7, 2005 || Kitt Peak || Spacewatch ||  || align=right | 2.6 km || 
|-id=883 bgcolor=#fefefe
| 587883 ||  || — || December 14, 2006 || Kitt Peak || Spacewatch ||  || align=right data-sort-value="0.92" | 920 m || 
|-id=884 bgcolor=#d6d6d6
| 587884 ||  || — || December 21, 2006 || Kitt Peak || Spacewatch ||  || align=right | 2.2 km || 
|-id=885 bgcolor=#d6d6d6
| 587885 ||  || — || December 21, 2006 || Kitt Peak || Spacewatch ||  || align=right | 2.4 km || 
|-id=886 bgcolor=#d6d6d6
| 587886 ||  || — || December 21, 2006 || Kitt Peak || Spacewatch ||  || align=right | 2.8 km || 
|-id=887 bgcolor=#d6d6d6
| 587887 ||  || — || December 21, 2006 || Kitt Peak || Spacewatch ||  || align=right | 2.6 km || 
|-id=888 bgcolor=#fefefe
| 587888 ||  || — || November 22, 2006 || Mount Lemmon || Mount Lemmon Survey ||  || align=right data-sort-value="0.85" | 850 m || 
|-id=889 bgcolor=#d6d6d6
| 587889 ||  || — || November 17, 2006 || Mount Lemmon || Mount Lemmon Survey ||  || align=right | 2.4 km || 
|-id=890 bgcolor=#d6d6d6
| 587890 ||  || — || December 21, 2006 || Mount Lemmon || Mount Lemmon Survey ||  || align=right | 2.4 km || 
|-id=891 bgcolor=#d6d6d6
| 587891 ||  || — || November 25, 2006 || Mount Lemmon || Mount Lemmon Survey ||  || align=right | 2.5 km || 
|-id=892 bgcolor=#d6d6d6
| 587892 ||  || — || June 27, 2015 || Haleakala || Pan-STARRS ||  || align=right | 2.1 km || 
|-id=893 bgcolor=#d6d6d6
| 587893 ||  || — || January 3, 2012 || Mount Lemmon || Mount Lemmon Survey ||  || align=right | 2.1 km || 
|-id=894 bgcolor=#d6d6d6
| 587894 ||  || — || September 26, 2006 || Moletai || K. Černis, J. Zdanavičius ||  || align=right | 3.1 km || 
|-id=895 bgcolor=#d6d6d6
| 587895 ||  || — || November 20, 2007 || Mount Lemmon || Mount Lemmon Survey ||  || align=right | 2.4 km || 
|-id=896 bgcolor=#d6d6d6
| 587896 ||  || — || March 25, 2014 || Mount Lemmon || Mount Lemmon Survey ||  || align=right | 2.6 km || 
|-id=897 bgcolor=#d6d6d6
| 587897 ||  || — || May 8, 2014 || Haleakala || Pan-STARRS ||  || align=right | 1.8 km || 
|-id=898 bgcolor=#d6d6d6
| 587898 ||  || — || October 26, 2011 || Haleakala || Pan-STARRS ||  || align=right | 1.9 km || 
|-id=899 bgcolor=#d6d6d6
| 587899 ||  || — || December 17, 2006 || 7300 || W. K. Y. Yeung ||  || align=right | 2.3 km || 
|-id=900 bgcolor=#E9E9E9
| 587900 ||  || — || December 17, 2006 || Mount Lemmon || Mount Lemmon Survey ||  || align=right | 1.4 km || 
|}

587901–588000 

|-bgcolor=#d6d6d6
| 587901 ||  || — || January 14, 2007 || Altschwendt || W. Ries ||  || align=right | 2.7 km || 
|-id=902 bgcolor=#fefefe
| 587902 ||  || — || January 9, 2007 || Kitt Peak || Spacewatch ||  || align=right data-sort-value="0.47" | 470 m || 
|-id=903 bgcolor=#d6d6d6
| 587903 ||  || — || January 10, 2007 || Mount Lemmon || Mount Lemmon Survey ||  || align=right | 2.4 km || 
|-id=904 bgcolor=#d6d6d6
| 587904 ||  || — || January 17, 2007 || Kitt Peak || Spacewatch ||  || align=right | 2.6 km || 
|-id=905 bgcolor=#E9E9E9
| 587905 ||  || — || January 24, 2007 || Mount Lemmon || Mount Lemmon Survey ||  || align=right | 1.1 km || 
|-id=906 bgcolor=#d6d6d6
| 587906 ||  || — || September 29, 2005 || Kitt Peak || Spacewatch ||  || align=right | 2.0 km || 
|-id=907 bgcolor=#d6d6d6
| 587907 ||  || — || January 27, 2007 || Mount Lemmon || Mount Lemmon Survey ||  || align=right | 2.4 km || 
|-id=908 bgcolor=#d6d6d6
| 587908 ||  || — || August 31, 2005 || Palomar || NEAT ||  || align=right | 3.0 km || 
|-id=909 bgcolor=#E9E9E9
| 587909 ||  || — || January 17, 2007 || Kitt Peak || Spacewatch ||  || align=right data-sort-value="0.95" | 950 m || 
|-id=910 bgcolor=#d6d6d6
| 587910 ||  || — || January 19, 2007 || Mauna Kea || Mauna Kea Obs. ||  || align=right | 2.2 km || 
|-id=911 bgcolor=#d6d6d6
| 587911 ||  || — || February 28, 2008 || Kitt Peak || Spacewatch ||  || align=right | 2.8 km || 
|-id=912 bgcolor=#d6d6d6
| 587912 ||  || — || July 17, 2004 || Cerro Tololo || Cerro Tololo Obs. ||  || align=right | 2.7 km || 
|-id=913 bgcolor=#E9E9E9
| 587913 ||  || — || March 30, 2008 || Kitt Peak || Spacewatch ||  || align=right data-sort-value="0.64" | 640 m || 
|-id=914 bgcolor=#E9E9E9
| 587914 ||  || — || December 27, 2006 || Mount Lemmon || Mount Lemmon Survey ||  || align=right | 1.00 km || 
|-id=915 bgcolor=#d6d6d6
| 587915 ||  || — || January 25, 2007 || Kitt Peak || Spacewatch ||  || align=right | 2.5 km || 
|-id=916 bgcolor=#d6d6d6
| 587916 ||  || — || October 26, 2005 || Kitt Peak || Spacewatch ||  || align=right | 2.0 km || 
|-id=917 bgcolor=#E9E9E9
| 587917 ||  || — || October 1, 2005 || Mount Lemmon || Mount Lemmon Survey ||  || align=right data-sort-value="0.91" | 910 m || 
|-id=918 bgcolor=#fefefe
| 587918 ||  || — || January 17, 2007 || Kitt Peak || Spacewatch ||  || align=right data-sort-value="0.80" | 800 m || 
|-id=919 bgcolor=#d6d6d6
| 587919 ||  || — || December 24, 2011 || Mount Lemmon || Mount Lemmon Survey ||  || align=right | 2.5 km || 
|-id=920 bgcolor=#d6d6d6
| 587920 ||  || — || January 28, 2007 || Mount Lemmon || Mount Lemmon Survey ||  || align=right | 2.3 km || 
|-id=921 bgcolor=#d6d6d6
| 587921 ||  || — || January 24, 2007 || Mount Lemmon || Mount Lemmon Survey ||  || align=right | 2.3 km || 
|-id=922 bgcolor=#d6d6d6
| 587922 ||  || — || January 26, 2007 || Kitt Peak || Spacewatch ||  || align=right | 2.5 km || 
|-id=923 bgcolor=#d6d6d6
| 587923 ||  || — || April 18, 2013 || Mount Lemmon || Mount Lemmon Survey ||  || align=right | 3.1 km || 
|-id=924 bgcolor=#d6d6d6
| 587924 ||  || — || January 28, 2007 || Kitt Peak || Spacewatch ||  || align=right | 2.4 km || 
|-id=925 bgcolor=#d6d6d6
| 587925 ||  || — || January 2, 2012 || Kitt Peak || Spacewatch ||  || align=right | 2.3 km || 
|-id=926 bgcolor=#d6d6d6
| 587926 ||  || — || June 24, 2014 || Mount Lemmon || Mount Lemmon Survey ||  || align=right | 2.2 km || 
|-id=927 bgcolor=#d6d6d6
| 587927 ||  || — || January 27, 2007 || Kitt Peak || Spacewatch ||  || align=right | 2.5 km || 
|-id=928 bgcolor=#d6d6d6
| 587928 ||  || — || January 17, 2007 || Kitt Peak || Spacewatch ||  || align=right | 1.9 km || 
|-id=929 bgcolor=#d6d6d6
| 587929 ||  || — || January 17, 2007 || Kitt Peak || Spacewatch ||  || align=right | 2.3 km || 
|-id=930 bgcolor=#d6d6d6
| 587930 ||  || — || January 27, 2007 || Kitt Peak || Spacewatch ||  || align=right | 2.0 km || 
|-id=931 bgcolor=#d6d6d6
| 587931 ||  || — || February 6, 2007 || Kitt Peak || Spacewatch ||  || align=right | 2.5 km || 
|-id=932 bgcolor=#d6d6d6
| 587932 ||  || — || February 8, 2007 || Kitt Peak || Spacewatch ||  || align=right | 2.5 km || 
|-id=933 bgcolor=#d6d6d6
| 587933 ||  || — || February 6, 2007 || Kitt Peak || Spacewatch ||  || align=right | 3.2 km || 
|-id=934 bgcolor=#d6d6d6
| 587934 ||  || — || January 24, 2007 || Mount Lemmon || Mount Lemmon Survey ||  || align=right | 2.0 km || 
|-id=935 bgcolor=#E9E9E9
| 587935 ||  || — || January 17, 2007 || Kitt Peak || Spacewatch ||  || align=right | 1.3 km || 
|-id=936 bgcolor=#E9E9E9
| 587936 ||  || — || January 27, 2007 || Mount Lemmon || Mount Lemmon Survey ||  || align=right data-sort-value="0.78" | 780 m || 
|-id=937 bgcolor=#d6d6d6
| 587937 ||  || — || February 15, 2007 || Catalina || CSS ||  || align=right | 3.0 km || 
|-id=938 bgcolor=#d6d6d6
| 587938 ||  || — || December 21, 2006 || Mount Lemmon || Mount Lemmon Survey ||  || align=right | 3.6 km || 
|-id=939 bgcolor=#fefefe
| 587939 ||  || — || January 29, 2003 || Apache Point || SDSS Collaboration ||  || align=right data-sort-value="0.58" | 580 m || 
|-id=940 bgcolor=#d6d6d6
| 587940 ||  || — || October 1, 2005 || Mount Lemmon || Mount Lemmon Survey ||  || align=right | 2.1 km || 
|-id=941 bgcolor=#E9E9E9
| 587941 ||  || — || February 14, 2007 || Mauna Kea || Mauna Kea Obs. ||  || align=right data-sort-value="0.99" | 990 m || 
|-id=942 bgcolor=#fefefe
| 587942 ||  || — || March 9, 2007 || Mount Lemmon || Mount Lemmon Survey ||  || align=right data-sort-value="0.61" | 610 m || 
|-id=943 bgcolor=#d6d6d6
| 587943 ||  || — || July 25, 2015 || Haleakala || Pan-STARRS ||  || align=right | 3.1 km || 
|-id=944 bgcolor=#d6d6d6
| 587944 ||  || — || February 6, 2007 || Mount Lemmon || Mount Lemmon Survey ||  || align=right | 2.2 km || 
|-id=945 bgcolor=#d6d6d6
| 587945 ||  || — || February 13, 2007 || Mount Lemmon || Mount Lemmon Survey ||  || align=right | 2.0 km || 
|-id=946 bgcolor=#d6d6d6
| 587946 ||  || — || February 6, 2007 || Mount Lemmon || Mount Lemmon Survey ||  || align=right | 2.2 km || 
|-id=947 bgcolor=#d6d6d6
| 587947 ||  || — || February 13, 2007 || Mount Lemmon || Mount Lemmon Survey ||  || align=right | 2.2 km || 
|-id=948 bgcolor=#d6d6d6
| 587948 ||  || — || February 7, 2007 || Kitt Peak || Spacewatch ||  || align=right | 3.3 km || 
|-id=949 bgcolor=#d6d6d6
| 587949 ||  || — || February 16, 2007 || Bergisch Gladbach || W. Bickel ||  || align=right | 3.0 km || 
|-id=950 bgcolor=#fefefe
| 587950 ||  || — || December 24, 2006 || Kitt Peak || Spacewatch ||  || align=right data-sort-value="0.66" | 660 m || 
|-id=951 bgcolor=#d6d6d6
| 587951 ||  || — || February 17, 2007 || Kitt Peak || Spacewatch || 3:2 || align=right | 3.9 km || 
|-id=952 bgcolor=#d6d6d6
| 587952 ||  || — || February 19, 2007 || Mount Lemmon || Mount Lemmon Survey ||  || align=right | 2.4 km || 
|-id=953 bgcolor=#fefefe
| 587953 ||  || — || February 17, 2007 || Mount Lemmon || Mount Lemmon Survey || H || align=right data-sort-value="0.44" | 440 m || 
|-id=954 bgcolor=#E9E9E9
| 587954 ||  || — || January 27, 2007 || Mount Lemmon || Mount Lemmon Survey ||  || align=right data-sort-value="0.72" | 720 m || 
|-id=955 bgcolor=#d6d6d6
| 587955 ||  || — || February 21, 2007 || Kitt Peak || Spacewatch ||  || align=right | 2.7 km || 
|-id=956 bgcolor=#d6d6d6
| 587956 ||  || — || February 21, 2007 || Kitt Peak || Spacewatch ||  || align=right | 2.2 km || 
|-id=957 bgcolor=#fefefe
| 587957 ||  || — || February 21, 2007 || Kitt Peak || Spacewatch || H || align=right data-sort-value="0.59" | 590 m || 
|-id=958 bgcolor=#d6d6d6
| 587958 ||  || — || February 21, 2007 || Kitt Peak || Spacewatch ||  || align=right | 2.8 km || 
|-id=959 bgcolor=#d6d6d6
| 587959 ||  || — || February 21, 2007 || Kitt Peak || Spacewatch ||  || align=right | 2.8 km || 
|-id=960 bgcolor=#d6d6d6
| 587960 ||  || — || February 21, 2007 || Kitt Peak || Spacewatch ||  || align=right | 2.5 km || 
|-id=961 bgcolor=#fefefe
| 587961 ||  || — || February 21, 2007 || Kitt Peak || Spacewatch ||  || align=right data-sort-value="0.49" | 490 m || 
|-id=962 bgcolor=#fefefe
| 587962 ||  || — || February 21, 2007 || Kitt Peak || Spacewatch ||  || align=right data-sort-value="0.71" | 710 m || 
|-id=963 bgcolor=#fefefe
| 587963 ||  || — || February 21, 2007 || Kitt Peak || Spacewatch ||  || align=right data-sort-value="0.49" | 490 m || 
|-id=964 bgcolor=#d6d6d6
| 587964 ||  || — || February 23, 2007 || Kitt Peak || Spacewatch ||  || align=right | 3.2 km || 
|-id=965 bgcolor=#d6d6d6
| 587965 ||  || — || January 27, 2007 || Kitt Peak || Spacewatch ||  || align=right | 2.2 km || 
|-id=966 bgcolor=#E9E9E9
| 587966 ||  || — || February 23, 2007 || Mount Lemmon || Mount Lemmon Survey ||  || align=right | 1.0 km || 
|-id=967 bgcolor=#d6d6d6
| 587967 ||  || — || February 25, 2007 || Kitt Peak || Spacewatch ||  || align=right | 2.4 km || 
|-id=968 bgcolor=#d6d6d6
| 587968 ||  || — || February 16, 2007 || Catalina || CSS ||  || align=right | 2.6 km || 
|-id=969 bgcolor=#fefefe
| 587969 ||  || — || February 23, 2007 || Kitt Peak || Spacewatch ||  || align=right data-sort-value="0.84" | 840 m || 
|-id=970 bgcolor=#d6d6d6
| 587970 ||  || — || February 25, 2007 || Mount Lemmon || Mount Lemmon Survey ||  || align=right | 2.6 km || 
|-id=971 bgcolor=#d6d6d6
| 587971 ||  || — || January 28, 2007 || Mount Lemmon || Mount Lemmon Survey ||  || align=right | 2.3 km || 
|-id=972 bgcolor=#d6d6d6
| 587972 ||  || — || June 5, 2014 || Haleakala || Pan-STARRS ||  || align=right | 2.7 km || 
|-id=973 bgcolor=#d6d6d6
| 587973 ||  || — || December 29, 2011 || Mount Lemmon || Mount Lemmon Survey ||  || align=right | 3.4 km || 
|-id=974 bgcolor=#d6d6d6
| 587974 ||  || — || February 19, 2002 || Kitt Peak || Spacewatch ||  || align=right | 2.0 km || 
|-id=975 bgcolor=#d6d6d6
| 587975 ||  || — || January 15, 2018 || Haleakala || Pan-STARRS ||  || align=right | 2.1 km || 
|-id=976 bgcolor=#d6d6d6
| 587976 ||  || — || February 22, 2007 || Kitt Peak || Spacewatch ||  || align=right | 2.3 km || 
|-id=977 bgcolor=#d6d6d6
| 587977 ||  || — || February 25, 2007 || Kitt Peak || Spacewatch ||  || align=right | 2.3 km || 
|-id=978 bgcolor=#fefefe
| 587978 ||  || — || February 17, 2007 || Kitt Peak || Spacewatch ||  || align=right data-sort-value="0.46" | 460 m || 
|-id=979 bgcolor=#d6d6d6
| 587979 ||  || — || February 17, 2007 || Kitt Peak || Spacewatch ||  || align=right | 2.5 km || 
|-id=980 bgcolor=#fefefe
| 587980 ||  || — || February 21, 2007 || Mount Lemmon || Mount Lemmon Survey ||  || align=right data-sort-value="0.58" | 580 m || 
|-id=981 bgcolor=#fefefe
| 587981 ||  || — || February 8, 2007 || Kitt Peak || Spacewatch || H || align=right data-sort-value="0.46" | 460 m || 
|-id=982 bgcolor=#d6d6d6
| 587982 ||  || — || February 17, 2007 || Kitt Peak || Spacewatch ||  || align=right | 2.3 km || 
|-id=983 bgcolor=#E9E9E9
| 587983 ||  || — || May 24, 2003 || Kitt Peak || Spacewatch ||  || align=right | 1.3 km || 
|-id=984 bgcolor=#E9E9E9
| 587984 ||  || — || February 23, 2007 || Mount Lemmon || Mount Lemmon Survey ||  || align=right data-sort-value="0.98" | 980 m || 
|-id=985 bgcolor=#d6d6d6
| 587985 ||  || — || March 10, 2007 || Mount Lemmon || Mount Lemmon Survey ||  || align=right | 2.9 km || 
|-id=986 bgcolor=#E9E9E9
| 587986 ||  || — || February 23, 2007 || Kitt Peak || Spacewatch ||  || align=right data-sort-value="0.89" | 890 m || 
|-id=987 bgcolor=#d6d6d6
| 587987 ||  || — || March 10, 2007 || Kitt Peak || Spacewatch ||  || align=right | 3.0 km || 
|-id=988 bgcolor=#fefefe
| 587988 ||  || — || March 11, 2007 || Kitt Peak || Spacewatch ||  || align=right data-sort-value="0.60" | 600 m || 
|-id=989 bgcolor=#E9E9E9
| 587989 ||  || — || March 10, 2007 || Eskridge || G. Hug ||  || align=right | 1.3 km || 
|-id=990 bgcolor=#d6d6d6
| 587990 ||  || — || March 10, 2007 || Mount Lemmon || Mount Lemmon Survey ||  || align=right | 1.9 km || 
|-id=991 bgcolor=#d6d6d6
| 587991 ||  || — || January 27, 2007 || Kitt Peak || Spacewatch ||  || align=right | 2.3 km || 
|-id=992 bgcolor=#fefefe
| 587992 ||  || — || March 10, 2007 || Kitt Peak || Spacewatch || H || align=right data-sort-value="0.54" | 540 m || 
|-id=993 bgcolor=#d6d6d6
| 587993 ||  || — || February 26, 2007 || Mount Lemmon || Mount Lemmon Survey ||  || align=right | 2.4 km || 
|-id=994 bgcolor=#d6d6d6
| 587994 ||  || — || January 28, 2007 || Mount Lemmon || Mount Lemmon Survey ||  || align=right | 3.2 km || 
|-id=995 bgcolor=#E9E9E9
| 587995 ||  || — || March 12, 2007 || Mount Lemmon || Mount Lemmon Survey ||  || align=right | 1.3 km || 
|-id=996 bgcolor=#d6d6d6
| 587996 ||  || — || March 9, 2007 || Mount Lemmon || Mount Lemmon Survey ||  || align=right | 2.2 km || 
|-id=997 bgcolor=#d6d6d6
| 587997 ||  || — || March 10, 2007 || Mount Lemmon || Mount Lemmon Survey ||  || align=right | 2.4 km || 
|-id=998 bgcolor=#E9E9E9
| 587998 ||  || — || March 10, 2007 || Mount Lemmon || Mount Lemmon Survey ||  || align=right | 1.3 km || 
|-id=999 bgcolor=#FA8072
| 587999 ||  || — || March 10, 2007 || Mount Lemmon || Mount Lemmon Survey || H || align=right data-sort-value="0.52" | 520 m || 
|-id=000 bgcolor=#E9E9E9
| 588000 ||  || — || September 24, 1992 || Kitt Peak || Spacewatch ||  || align=right | 1.00 km || 
|}

References

External links 
 Discovery Circumstances: Numbered Minor Planets (585001)–(590000) (IAU Minor Planet Center)

0587